= Neajlov =

- Neajlov near Dealu, Giurgiu

- Location within Romania

Location
- Country: Romania
- Counties: Argeș, Dâmbovița, Giurgiu

Physical characteristics
- Mouth: Argeș
  - location: Comana
  - coordinates: 44°11′14″N 26°12′22″E
- Length: 188 km (117 mi)
- Basin size: 3,718.5 km^{2} (1,435.7 sq mi)

Basin features
- Progression: Argeș→ Danube→ Black Sea
- Tributaries
  - right: Dâmbovnic, Câlniștea

The Neajlov is a river in Romania. It is a right tributary of the river Argeș, which it meets near Gostinari, Giurgiu County. It rises from the higher Romanian Plain, east of Pitești. It is 188 km (117 mi) long and its basin area is 3,718.5 km^{2} (1,435.7 sq mi).

== Location ==
The river basin is located in the southern part of Romania, its geographic range being 24°51’12” to 26°13’52” E longitude and 43°55’31” to 44°49’32” N latitude.

== Towns and villages ==
The following towns and villages are situated along the river Neajlov, from source to mouth: Oarja, Morteni, Petrești, Uliești, Corbii Mari, Vânătorii Mici, Crevedia Mare, Clejani, Bulbucata, Iepurești, Singureni, Călugăreni, Comana.

== Tributaries ==
The following rivers are tributaries to the river Neajlov (from source to mouth):

Left: Neajlovel (I), Neajlovel (II), Izvor, Ilfovăț

Right: Valea Strâmbă, Copăcel, Holboca, Baracu, Chiricanu, Dâmbovnic, Bălăria, Vârtop, Câlniștea, Dadilovăț, Gurban

== Lakes ==
- Lake Comana

== History ==
The Battle of Călugăreni from August 1595 between the Wallachian army led by Michael the Brave and the Ottoman army led by Koca Sinan Pasha, was fought on the banks of the Neajlov.
