= Holboca (river) =

- Location within Romania

Location
- Country: Romania
- Counties: Dâmbovița County
- Villages: Răscăeți, Vișina, Hanu lui Pală

Physical characteristics
- Mouth: Neajlov
  - coordinates: 44.5490°N 25.4608°E
- Length: 45 km (28 mi)
- Basin size: 86 km^{2} (33 sq mi)

Basin features
- Progression: Neajlov→ Argeș→ Danube→ Black Sea
- Tributaries
  - left: Pălălău

The Holboca is a right tributary of the river Neajlov in Romania. It discharges into the Neajlov in Bărăceni. Its length is 45 km (28 mi) and its basin size is 86 km^{2} (33 sq mi).
