= Potop (river) =

- Location within Romania

Location
- Country: Romania
- Counties: Dâmbovița County
- Villages: Ludești, Hulubești, Bădulești

Physical characteristics
- Mouth: Sabar
  - coordinates: 44.7197°N 25.3740°E
- Length: 55 km (34 mi)
- Basin size: 302 km^{2} (117 sq mi)

Basin features
- Progression: Sabar→ Argeș→ Danube→ Black Sea
- Tributaries
  - left: Butoiul, Valea Foii, Cobia

The Potop is a left tributary of the river Sabar in Romania. It discharges into the Sabar east of Găești. Its length is 55 km (34 mi) and its basin size is 302 km^{2} (117 sq mi).
