= Izvor (Neajlov) =

River Tributary in Romania

- Location within Romania

Location
- Country: Romania
- Counties: Dâmbovița County
- Villages: Coada Izvorului, Izvoru

Physical characteristics
- Mouth: Neajlov
  - coordinates: 44.6008°N 25.3814°E
- Length: 15 km (9.3 mi)
- Basin size: 23 km^{2} (8.9 sq mi)

Basin features
- Progression: Neajlov→ Argeș→ Danube→ Black Sea

The Izvor is a left tributary of the river Neajlov in Romania. It flows into the Neajlov near Ragu. Its length is 15 km (9.3 mi) and its basin size is 23 km^{2} (8.9 sq mi).
