= Izvoru (disambiguation) =

Izvoru may refer to several places in Romania:

- Izvoru, a commune in Argeș County
- Izvoru, a village in Cozieni Commune, Buzău County
- Izvoru, a village in Tisău Commune, Buzău County
- Izvoru, a village in Valea Lungă Commune, Dâmbovița County
- Izvoru, a village in Vișina Commune, Dâmbovița County
- Izvoru, a village in Gogoșari Commune, Giurgiu County
- Izvoru, a village in Vânătorii Mici Commune, Giurgiu County
- Izvoru, a village in Ion Creangă Commune, Neamț County
- Izvoru, a village in Găneasa Commune, Olt County
- Izvoru, a village in Provița de Sus Commune, Prahova County
- Izvoru, a village in Crețeni Commune, Vâlcea County
- Izvoru Crișului, a commune in Cluj County
- Izvoru Mare, a village in Peștera Commune, Constanța County
- Izvoru Mureșului, a village in Voșlăbeni Commune, Harghita County
