= Baracu =

- Location within Romania

Location
- Country: Romania
- Counties: Dâmbovița, Giurgiu

Physical characteristics
- Mouth: Neajlov
  - coordinates: 44.4841°N 25.5633°E
- Length: 29 km (18 mi)
- Basin size: 40 km^{2} (15 sq mi)

Basin features
- Progression: Neajlov→ Argeș→ Danube→ Black Sea

The Baracu is a right tributary of the river Neajlov in Romania. It flows into the Neajlov in Vânătorii Mici. Its length is 29 km (18 mi) and its basin size is 40 km^{2} (15 sq mi).
