= Crevedia (disambiguation) =

Crevedia may refer to several entities in Romania:

- Crevedia, a commune in Dâmboviţa County
- Crevedia Mare, a commune located in Giurgiu County
- Crevedia Mică, a commune located in Giurgiu County
- Crevedia, a tributary of the Chiricanu in southern Romania
- Crevedia (Colentina), a tributary of the Colentina in Dâmbovița County
- Crevedia (Jiu), a tributary of the Jiul de Vest in Hunedoara County
- N. Crevedia, a poet
