= Vișina, Dâmbovița =

Vișina
- Commune
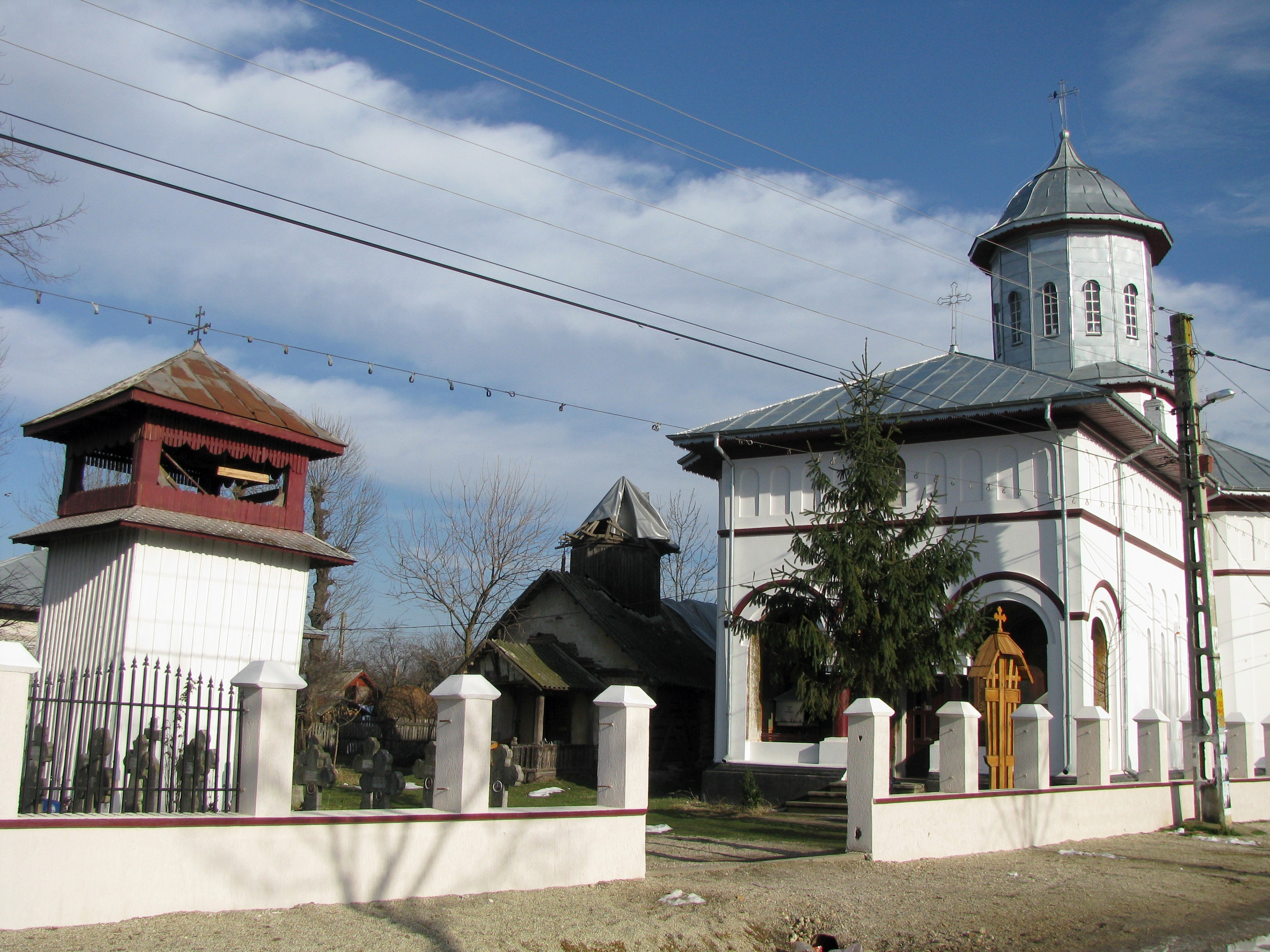
- Churches in Vișina

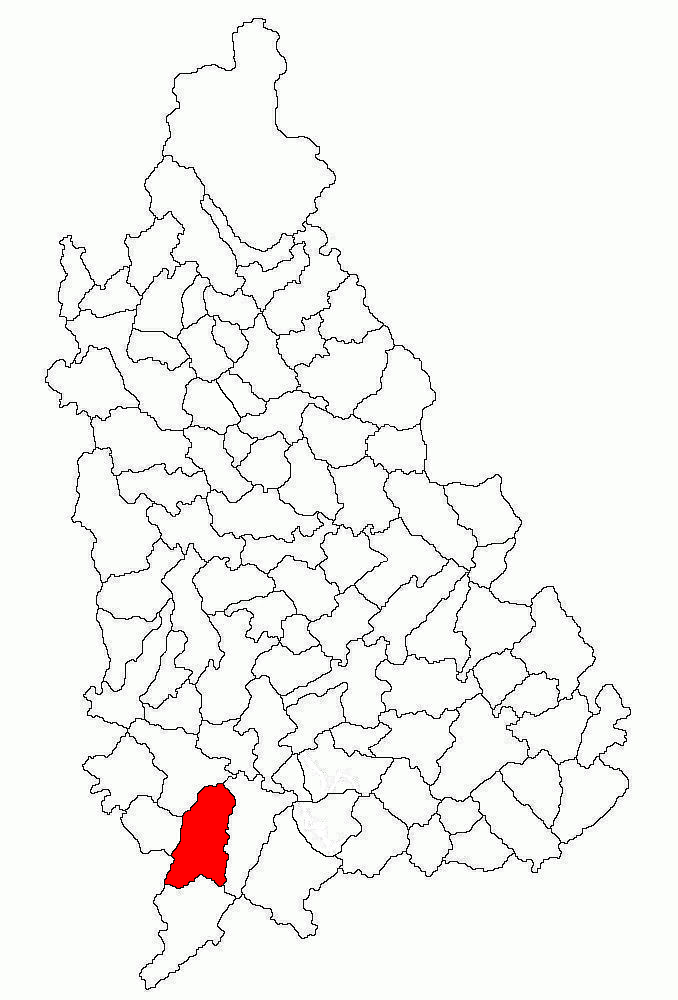
- Location in Dâmbovița County

- Location in Romania
- Country: Romania
- County: Dâmbovița

Government
  - Mayor (2020–2024): Jean-Aurelian Istrate (PSD)
- Area: 74.97 km^{2} (28.95 sq mi)
- Highest elevation: 190 m (620 ft)
- Lowest elevation: 169 m (554 ft)
- Population (2021-12-01): 3,838
  - Density: 51.19/km^{2} (132.6/sq mi)
- Time zone: UTC+02:00 (EET)
  - Summer (DST): UTC+03:00 (EEST)
- Postal code: 137515
- Area code: +(40) 245
- Vehicle reg.: DB
- Website: www.primariavisina-db.ro

Vișina is a commune in Dâmbovița County, Muntenia, Romania with a population of 3,838 people as of 2021. It is composed of three villages: Broșteni, Izvoru, and Vișina.

The commune is located in the southwestern extremity of the county, in the Găvanu-Burdea subdivision of the Wallachian Plain. It lies on the banks of the river Izvor, at a distance of 45 km (28 mi) from the county seat, Târgoviște, on the DJ611 county road. The nearest towns are Găești at 18 km (11 mi) and Titu at 36 km (22 mi).

Vișina borders the following communes: Petrești to the north, Șelaru to the south, Uliești and Corbii Mari to the east, and Răscăeți and Morteni to the west. Răscăeți commune split off Vișina after a referendum in 2005.

Historical population
Year	Pop.	±%
2002	4,334	—
2011	4,103	−5.3%
2021	3,838	−6.5%
Source: Census data
