= Catanele =

Catanele may refer to several villages in Romania:

- Catanele, a village in Căteasca Commune, Argeș County
- Catanele, a village in Gura Foii Commune, Dâmboviţa County
- Catanele, a village in Schitu Commune, Olt County
- Catanele Noi, a village in Catane Commune, Dolj County
