= Vișina =

Vișina may refer to several places in Romania:

- Vișina, Dâmbovița, a commune in Dâmbovița County
- Vișina, Olt, a commune in Olt County
- Vișina Nouă, a commune in Olt County
- Vișina, a village in Poiana Commune, Galați County
- Vișina, a village in Greci Commune, Mehedinți County
- Vișina, a village in Jurilovca Commune, Tulcea County

== See also ==
- Vișinești, a commune in Dâmbovița County, southern Romania
