= Neajlovel =

- Location within Romania

Location
- Country: Romania
- Counties: Argeș, Dâmbovița

Physical characteristics
- Mouth: Neajlov
  - location: Neajlovu
  - coordinates: 44.6617°N 25.2804°E
- Length: 21 km (13 mi)
- Basin size: 23 km^{2} (8.9 sq mi)

Basin features
- Progression: Neajlov→ Argeș→ Danube→ Black Sea

The Neajlovel is a left tributary of the river Neajlov in Romania. It flows into the Neajlov in the village Neajlovu. Its length is 21 km (13 mi) and its basin size is 23 km^{2} (8.9 sq mi).
