= Cobia (river) =

- Location within Romania

Location
- Country: Romania
- Counties: Dâmbovița County
- Villages: Mislea, Gherghițești, Făgetu

Physical characteristics
- Mouth: Potop
  - coordinates: 44.7368°N 25.3037°E
- Length: 29 km (18 mi)
- Basin size: 56 km^{2} (22 sq mi)

Basin features
- Progression: Potop→ Sabar→ Argeș→ Danube→ Black Sea
- Tributaries
  - right: Raciu

The Cobia is a left tributary of the river Potop in Romania. It flows into the Potop north of Găești. Its length is 29 km (18 mi) and its basin size is 56 km^{2} (22 sq mi).
