= Neajlovu =

Neajlovu may refer to several villages in Romania:

- Neajlovu, a village in Morteni Commune, Dâmboviţa County
- Neajlovu, a village in Clejani Commune, Giurgiu County
