= Silvia Radu =

Silvia Radu may refer to:

- Silvia Radu (sculptor) (1935-2025), Romanian artist
- Silvia Radu (politician) (born 1972), Moldovan politician
