= Voia =

Voia may refer to several villages in Romania:

- Voia, a village in Crângurile Commune, Dâmbovița County
- Voia, a village in Balșa Commune, Hunedoara County
