= Dospinești =

Dospineşti may refer to several villages in Romania:

- Dospineşti, a village in Buhoci Commune, Bacău County
- Dospineşti, a village in Vișinești Commune, Dâmboviţa County
