= Bălăria =

River in Romania

- Location within Romania

Location
- Country: Romania
- Counties: Giurgiu County
- Villages: Valea Plopilor, Valter Mărăcineanu

Physical characteristics
- Mouth: Neajlov
  - coordinates: 44.2319°N 25.9381°E
- Length: 18 km (11 mi)
- Basin size: 66 km^{2} (25 sq mi)

Basin features
- Progression: Neajlov→ Argeș→ Danube→ Black Sea

The Bălăria is a right tributary of the river Neajlov in Romania. It flows into the Neajlov in Singureni. Its length is 18 km (11 mi) and its basin size is 66 km^{2} (25 sq mi).
