= Chirculești =

Chirculeşti may refer to several villages in Romania:

- Chirculeşti, a village in Iepurești Commune, Giurgiu County
- Chirculeşti, a village in Bălceşti Commune, Vâlcea County
