= Potop =

Potop (deluge in most Slavic languages) may refer to:

- The Deluge (novel) (original title: Potop), a historical novel by Henryk Sienkiewicz
- The Deluge (film) (original title: Potop), a 1974 movie directed by Jerzy Hoffman, based on Sienkiewicz's novel
- Deluge (history) (Polish: potop or potop szwedzki), a Swedish and Russian invasion and occupation of the Polish–Lithuanian Commonwealth
- Potop, Bulgaria, a village in Bulgaria
- Potop (river), a tributary of the Sabar in Dâmbovița County, Romania
