= Bădulești =

Băduleşti may refer to several villages in Romania:

- Băduleşti, a village in Uda, Argeș
- Băduleşti, a village in Crângurile Commune, Dâmboviţa County
