= Chiricanu =

- Location within Romania

Location
- Country: Romania
- Counties: Dâmbovița, Giurgiu
- Villages: Crevedia Mare

Physical characteristics
- Mouth: Neajlov
  - location: Crevedia Mare
  - coordinates: 44.4175°N 25.6199°E
- Length: 49 km (30 mi)

Basin features
- Progression: Neajlov→ Argeș→ Danube→ Black Sea
- Tributaries
  - right: Crevedia

The Chiricanu is a right tributary of the river Neajlov in Romania. It flows into the Neajlov in Crevedia Mare. Its length is 49 km (30 mi) and its basin size is 91 km^{2} (35 sq mi).
