= Ilfov =

Ilfov may refer to:

- Ilfov (river), in Romania
- Ilfov County, the county that surrounds Bucharest, Romania

== See also ==
- Ilfovăț, a left tributary of the river Neajlov in Romania
