= Silvia Radu (sculptor) =

Romanian sculptor (1935–2025)

Silvia Elena Radu
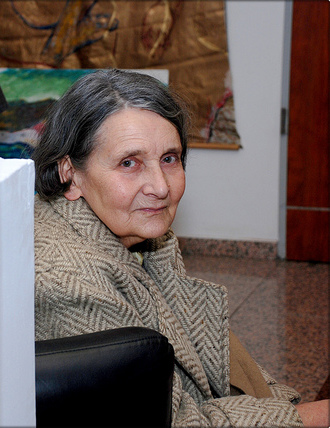
- Born: 30 June 1935; Pătroaia-Vale, Dâmbovița County, Romania
- Died: 25 May 2025 (aged 89); Bucharest, Romania
- Education: Bucharest Academy of Fine Arts
- Spouse: Vasile Gorduz

Silvia Elena Radu (30 June 1935 – 25 May 2025) was a Romanian sculptor, potter and painter.

== Life and career ==
Born in Pătroaia-Vale, Dâmbovița County, she graduated in 1960 from the Bucharest Academy of Fine Arts. She was the wife of the sculptor Vasile Gorduz.

Her work is in the Tyler Collection of Romanian and Modern Art. She was the author of monumental works in public spaces in Romania and of sculptures which can be found in public and private collections.

Radu died on 25 May 2025, at the age of 89.

Art in public spaces

- 1965 – "Legend of Meșterul Manole", Herăstrău Park, Bucharest
- 1986 – "Heroes memorial statue", Potlogeni
- 1969 – "Environmental sculpture", Costinești
- 1971 – "Neptune" marble sculpture, Neptun
- 1994 – The "Saint George" bronze sculpture, St. George Square, Timișoara

Awards

- 1968 – the 2nd prize for sculpture of the Union of Artists
- 1974 – the 2nd prize for monumental art
- 1999 – Memory and Project Exhibition Award
- 2003 – "Prometheus Opera Omnia" Award of the Anonymous Foundation, together with Vasile Gorduz
