= Bulbucata =

- Commune
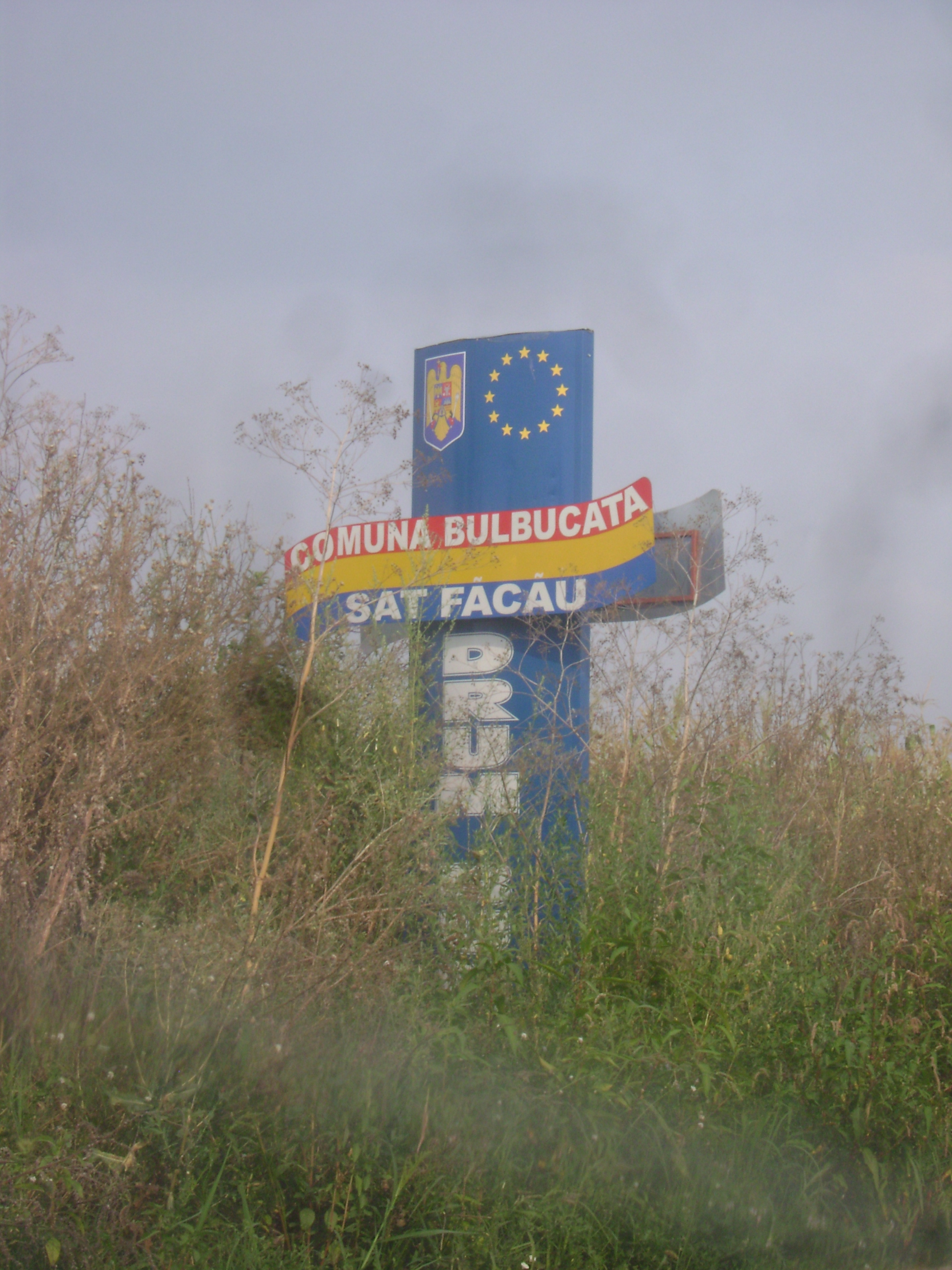
- Goodbye sign at the commune exit

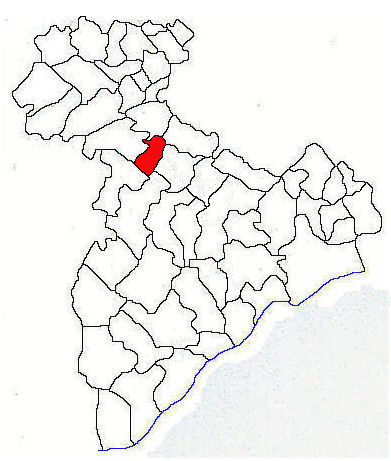
- Location in Giurgiu County

- Location in Romania
- Coordinates: 44°17′N 25°48′E
- Country: Romania
- County: Giurgiu

Government
  - Mayor (2024–2028): Iulian Andrei (PNL)
- Area: 24.63 km^{2} (9.51 sq mi)
- Elevation: 71 m (233 ft)
- Population (2021-12-01): 1,650
  - Density: 67.0/km^{2} (174/sq mi)
- Time zone: UTC+02:00 (EET)
  - Summer (DST): UTC+03:00 (EEST)
- Postal code: 87030
- Area code: +(40) x46
- Vehicle reg.: GR
- Website: comunabulbucata.ro

Bulbucata is a commune located in Giurgiu County, Romania, in the traditional region of Muntenia. It is composed of four villages: Bulbucata, Coteni, Făcău, and Teișori.

The commune is situated in the Wallachian Plain, at an altitude of 71 m (233 ft), on the banks of the Neajlov River and its left tributary, the Ilfovăț. It is located in the central-north part of the county, 52 km (32 mi) north of the county seat, Giurgiu, and 33 km (21 mi) southwest of the country's capital, Bucharest.

Historical population
Year	Pop.	±%
2002	1,716	—
2011	1,591	−7.3%
2021	1,650	+3.7%
Source: Census data
