= Lucieni =

- Commune
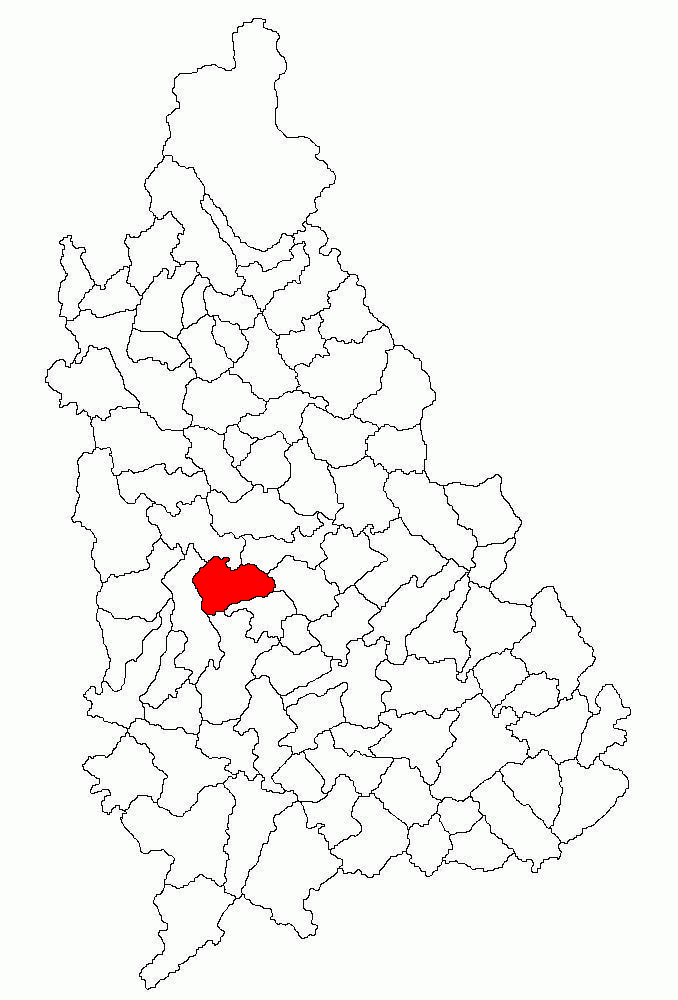
- Location in Dâmbovița County

- Location in Romania
- Coordinates: 44°51′N 25°27′E
- Country: Romania
- County: Dâmbovița

Government
  - Mayor (2024–2028): Vasile Tița (PSD)
- Area: 44.44 km^{2} (17.16 sq mi)
- Elevation: 249 m (817 ft)
- Population (2021-12-01): 3,138
  - Density: 71/km^{2} (180/sq mi)
- Time zone: EET/EEST (UTC+2/+3)
- Postal code: 137265
- Area code: +(40) 245
- Vehicle reg.: DB
- Website: www.primarialucieni.ro

Lucieni is a commune in Dâmbovița County, Muntenia, Romania with a population of 3,138 people as of 2021. It is composed of two villages, Lucieni and Olteni. It also included three other villages from 1968 to 2004, when they were split off to re-establish Raciu Commune.

Historical population
Year	Pop.	±%
2002	3,095	—
2011	3,131	+1.2%
2021	3,138	+0.2%
Source: Census data

== Natives ==
- Marlena Zagoni (born 1951), rower
