= Cobia, Dâmbovița =

Cobia
- Commune
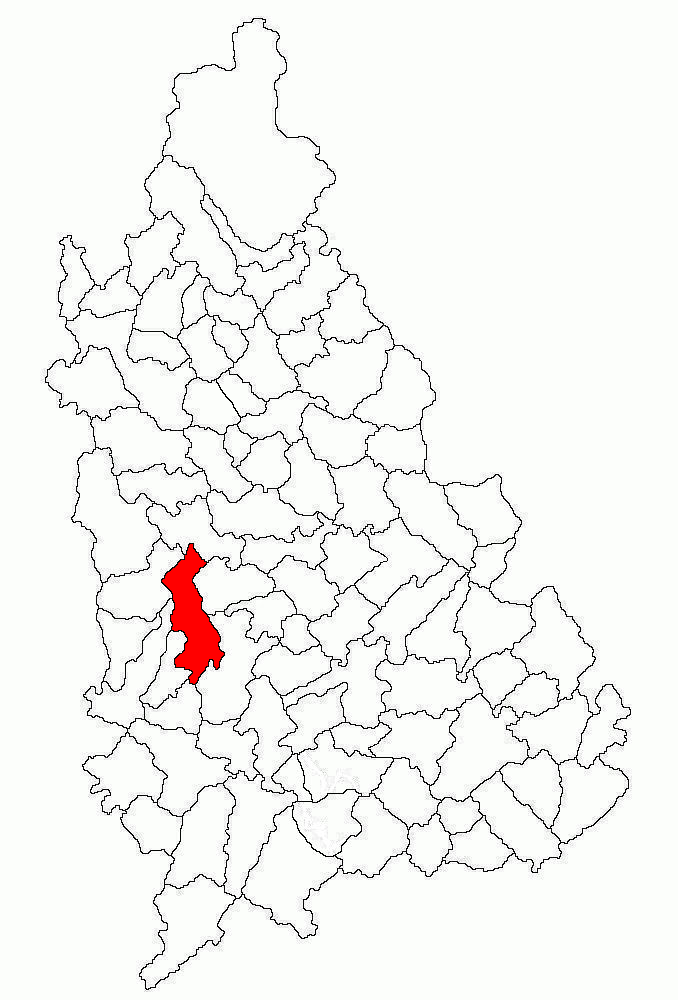
- Location in Dâmbovița County

- Location in Romania
- Coordinates: 44°48′N 25°19′E
- Country: Romania
- County: Dâmbovița

Government
  - Mayor (2020–2024): Marin Manda (PSD)
- Area: 62.76 km^{2} (24.23 sq mi)
- Elevation: 229 m (751 ft)
- Population (2021-12-01): 3,083
  - Density: 49/km^{2} (130/sq mi)
- Time zone: EET/EEST (UTC+2/+3)
- Postal code: 137104
- Area code: +(40) 245
- Vehicle reg.: DB
- Website: cobia.ro

Cobia is a commune in Dâmbovița County, Muntenia, Romania. It is composed of ten villages: Blidari, Călugăreni, Căpșuna, Cobiuța, Crăciunești, Frasin-Deal, Frasin-Vale, Gherghițești (the commune center), Mănăstirea, and Mislea.

The commune is situated in the Wallachian Plain, on the banks of the river Cobia. It is located in the central-west part of the county, 10 km (6.2 mi) north of the town of Găești and 20 km (12 mi) southwest of the county seat, Târgoviște.

Historical population
Year	Pop.	±%
2002	3,467	—
2011	3,180	−8.3%
2021	3,083	−3.1%
Source: Census data

== Natives ==
- Ion Dincă (1928 – 2007), communist politician and Army general
