= Raciu =

- Commune
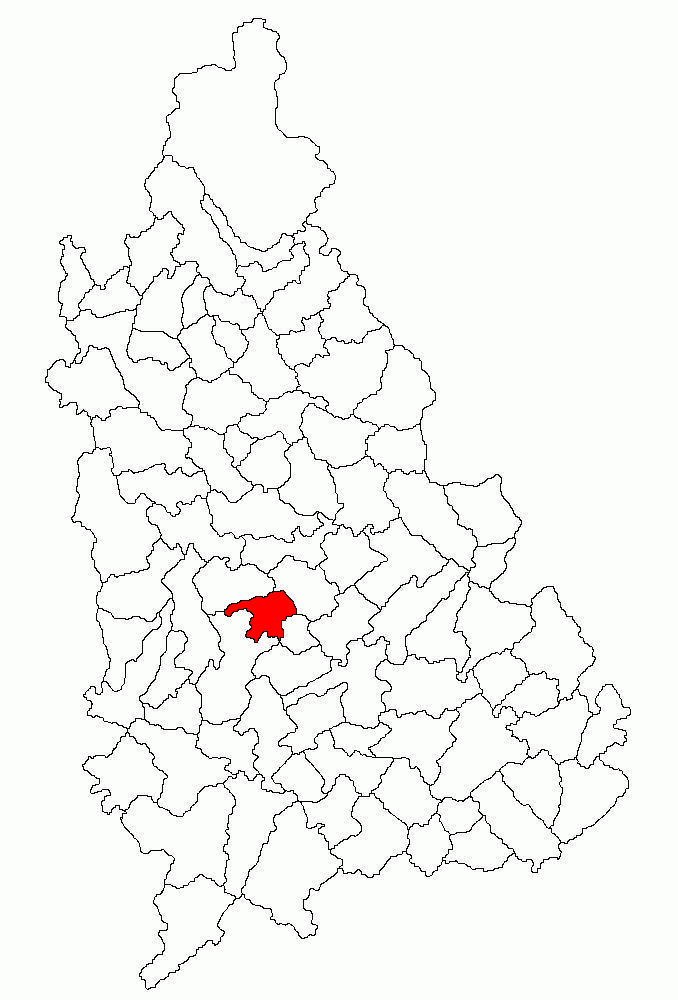
- Location in Dâmbovița County

- Location in Romania
- Coordinates: 44°48′50″N 25°26′40″E
- Country: Romania
- County: Dâmbovița

Government
  - Mayor (2020–2024): Vasile Grădinaru (PSD)
- Area: 24.95 km^{2} (9.63 sq mi)
- Elevation: 239 m (784 ft)
- Population (2021-12-01): 3,236
  - Density: 130/km^{2} (340/sq mi)
- Time zone: EET/EEST (UTC+2/+3)
- Postal code: 137267
- Area code: +(40) 245
- Vehicle reg.: DB
- Website: www.raciu.ro

Raciu is a commune in Dâmbovița County, Muntenia, Romania. It is composed of three villages: Raciu, Siliștea, and Șuța Seacă. These were part of Lucieni Commune from 1968 to 2004, when they were split off to re-establish a separate commune.

Historical population
Year	Pop.	±%
2002	3,297	—
2011	3,464	+5.1%
2021	3,236	−6.6%
Source: Census data
