= Ilfovăț =

- Location within Romania

Location
- Country: Romania
- Counties: Giurgiu County
- Villages: Podișor, Pădureni, Făcău

Physical characteristics
- Mouth: Neajlov
  - location: Iepurești
  - coordinates: 44.2604°N 25.8982°E
- Length: 39 km (24 mi)
- Basin size: 93 km^{2} (36 sq mi)

Basin features
- Progression: Neajlov→ Argeș→ Danube→ Black Sea

The Ilfovăț is a left tributary of the river Neajlov in Romania. Its length is 39 km (24 mi) and its basin size is 93 km^{2} (36 sq mi). It discharges into the Neajlov in Iepurești.
