= Văcărești, Dâmbovița =

Văcărești
- Commune
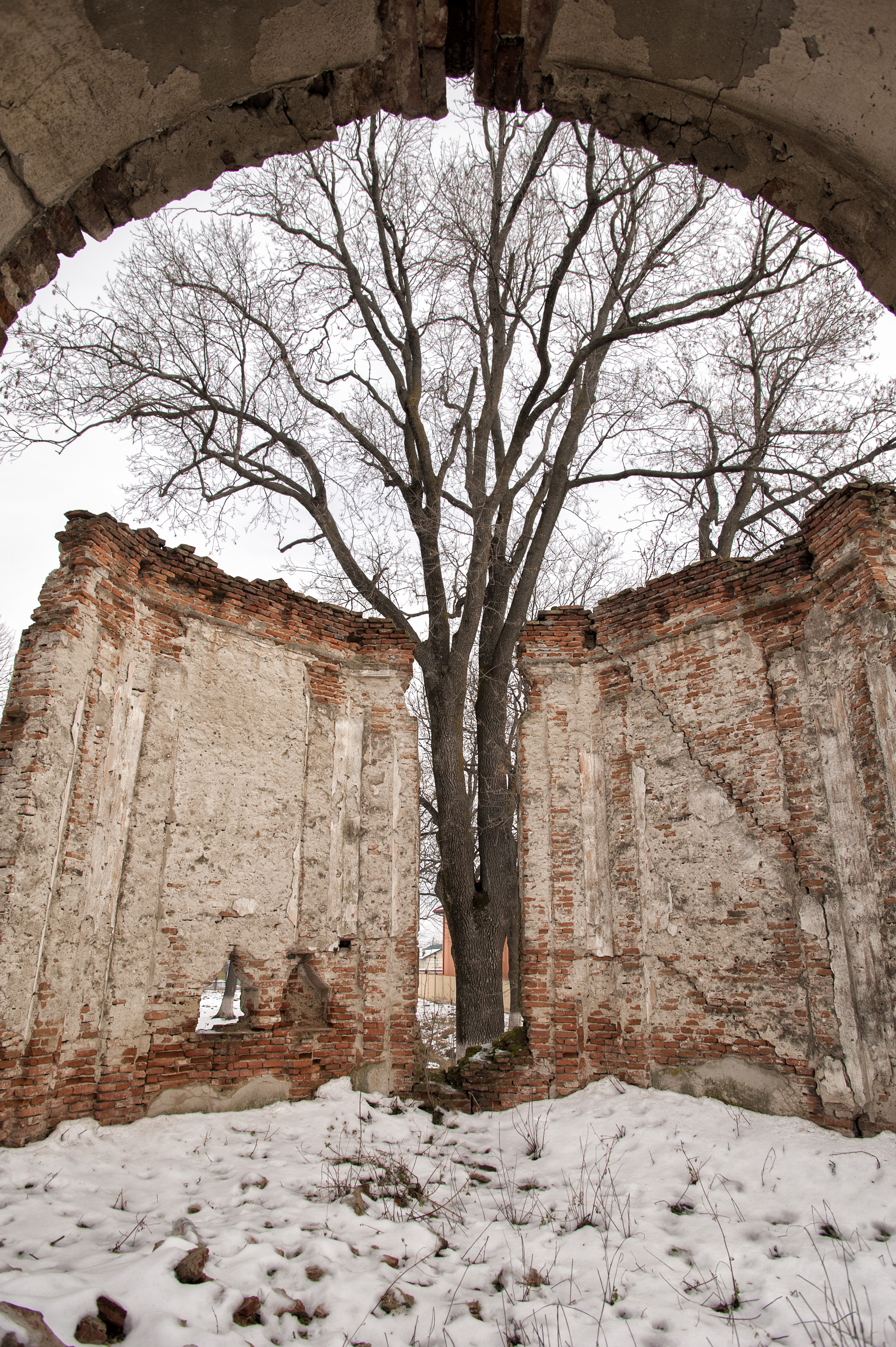
- Ruins of chapel in Văcărești

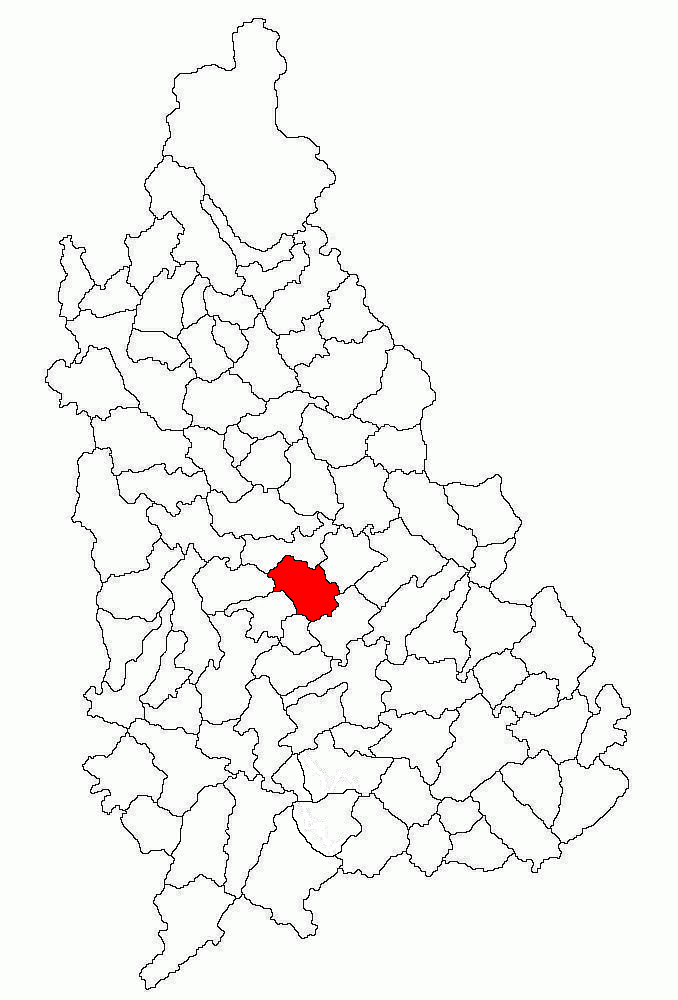
- Location in Dâmbovița County

- Location in Romania
- Coordinates: 44°51′N 25°29′E
- Country: Romania
- County: Dâmbovița

Government
  - Mayor (2020–2024): Romică Stoica (PSD)
- Area: 39.06 km^{2} (15.08 sq mi)
- Elevation: 347 m (1,138 ft)
- Population (2021-12-01): 5,060
  - Density: 130/km^{2} (336/sq mi)
- Time zone: UTC+02:00 (EET)
  - Summer (DST): UTC+03:00 (EEST)
- Postal code: 137495
- Area code: +(40) 245
- Vehicle reg.: DB
- Website: primariavacaresti.ro

Văcărești is a commune in Dâmbovița County, Muntenia, Romania. It is composed of three villages: Bungetu, Brăteștii de Jos, and Văcărești. Until 2004, it also included Perșinari village, split off that year to form a separate commune.

Historical population
Year	Pop.	±%
2002	5,007	—
2011	5,246	+4.8%
2021	5,060	−3.5%
Source: Census data
