= Gurban (river) =

River in Romania

- Location within Romania

Location
- Country: Romania
- Counties: Giurgiu County
- Villages: Vlad Țepeș, Comana

Physical characteristics
- Mouth: Neajlov
  - coordinates: 44.1769°N 26.1447°E
- Length: 11 km (6.8 mi)
- Basin size: 72 km^{2} (28 sq mi)

Basin features
- Progression: Neajlov→ Argeș→ Danube→ Black Sea

The Gurban is a right tributary of the river Neajlov in Romania. It flows into the Neajlov in Comana. Its length is 11 km (6.8 mi) and its basin size is 72 km^{2} (28 sq mi).
