= Perșinari =

- Commune
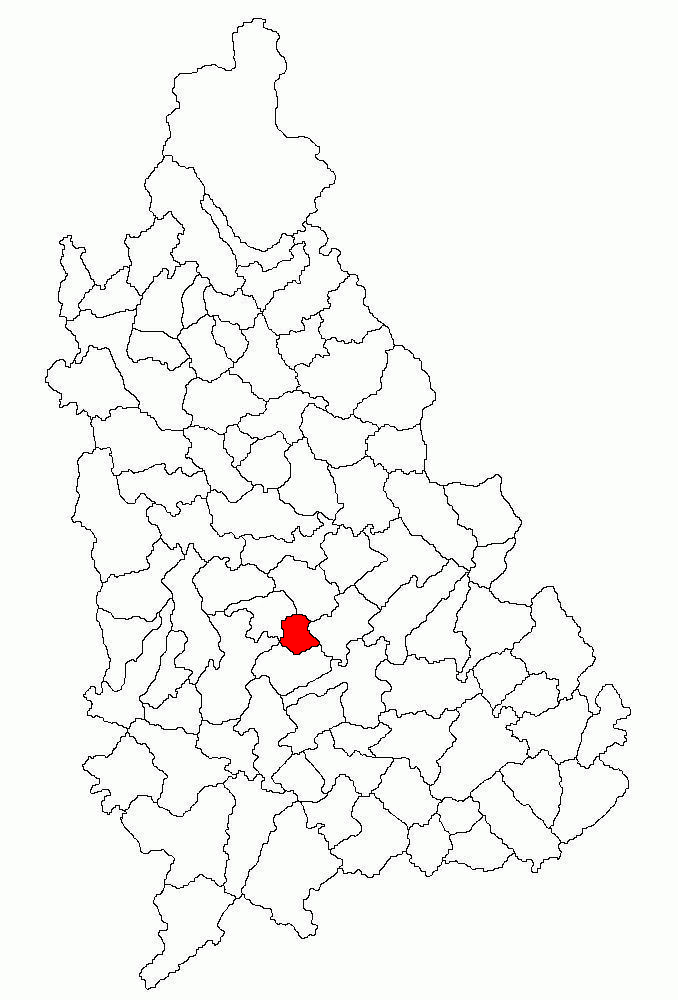
- Location in Dâmbovița County

- Location in Romania
- Coordinates: 44°48′07″N 25°29′56″E
- Country: Romania
- County: Dâmbovița
- Population (2021-12-01): 2,519
- Time zone: EET/EEST (UTC+2/+3)
- Vehicle reg.: DB

Perșinari is a commune in Dâmbovița County, Muntenia, Romania. It is composed of a single village, Perșinari. The commune was established in 2004, when the village was split off from Văcărești Commune to form a separate entity.

== History ==
At the end of the 19th century, Perșinari was part of Dâmbovița County and comprised only the residence village with 1,053 inhabitants. There was a school, a church and a water mill.

In 1925, the Anuarul Socec noted that 1,521 inhabitants lived in one village of the commune of Perșinari in the Titu side of the same county. In 1950, the commune was moved to the Titu district of București Region, and in 1968 it returned to Dâmbovița County.

The municipality of Perșinari was re-established in 2004, in accordance with the village of Perșinari's old composition.

Historical population
Year	Pop.	±%
2002	2,877	—
2011	2,750	−4.4%
2021	2,519	−8.4%
Source: Census data

== Natives ==
- Ion Dolănescu (1944–2009), singer of folk music, politician
