= Vânătorii Mici =

- Commune
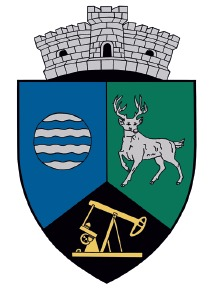
- Coat of arms

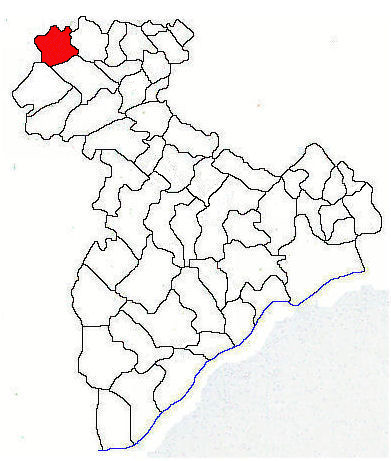
- Location in Giurgiu County

- Location in Romania
- Coordinates: 44°29′N 25°34′E
- Country: Romania
- County: Giurgiu

Government
  - Mayor (2020–2024): Aurelian Simion (PSD)
- Area: 58.03 km^{2} (22.41 sq mi)
- Elevation: 126 m (413 ft)
- Population (2021-12-01): 4,584
  - Density: 79/km^{2} (200/sq mi)
- Time zone: EET/EEST (UTC+2/+3)
- Postal code: 087250
- Area code: +(40) 246
- Vehicle reg.: GR
- Website: comunavanatoriimici.ro

Vânătorii Mici is a commune located in Giurgiu County, Muntenia, Romania. It is composed of eight villages: Corbeanca, Cupele, Izvoru, Poiana lui Stângă, Vâlcelele, Vânătorii Mari, Vânătorii Mici, and Zădăriciu.

The commune is situated in the Wallachian Plain, at an altitude of 126 m (413 ft), on the banks of the rivers Argeș and Neajlov. It is located at the northwestern extremity of Giurgiu County, on the border with Dâmbovița and Teleorman counties.

Vânătorii Mici is 80 km (50 mi) north of the county seat, the port city of Giurgiu, and 48 km (30 mi) west of the country's capital, Bucharest. It is crossed by national road DN61, which connects the town of Găești, 36 km (22 mi) to the northwest, to Giurgiu.

Historical population
Year	Pop.	±%
2002	5,049	—
2011	4,933	−2.3%
2021	4,584	−7.1%
Source: Census data
