= Hulubești =

- Commune
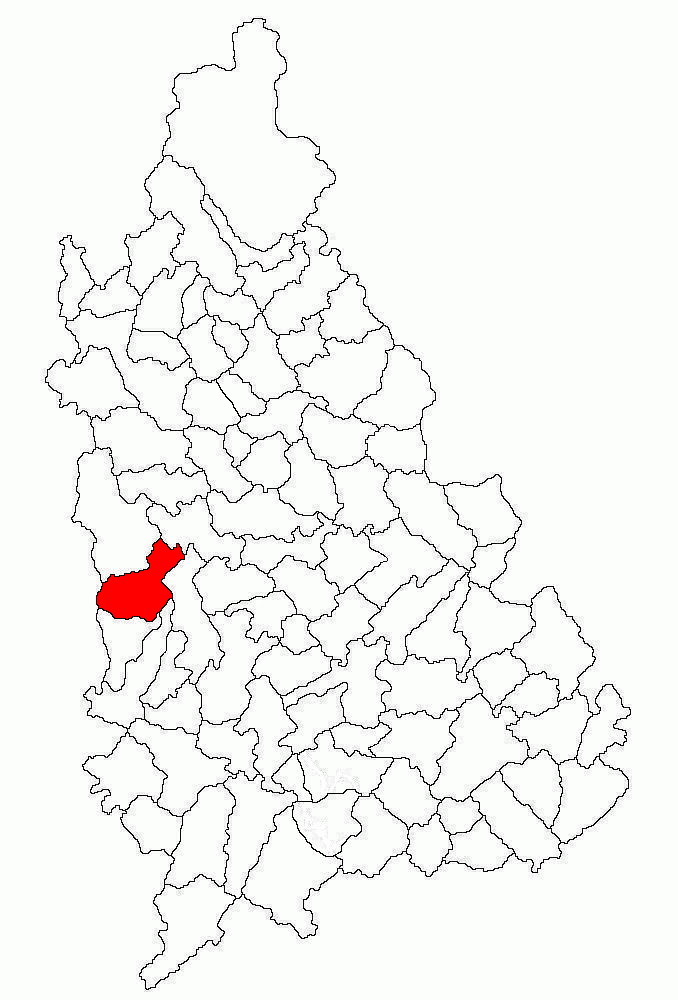
- Location in Dâmbovița County

- Location in Romania
- Coordinates: 44°50′N 25°14′E
- Country: Romania
- County: Dâmbovița

Government
  - Mayor (2024–2028): Ion Cursureanu (PSD)
- Elevation: 251 m (823 ft)
- Population (2021-12-01): 3,052
- Time zone: EET/EEST (UTC+2/+3)
- Postal code: 137250
- Area code: +(40) 245
- Vehicle reg.: DB
- Website: primariahulubesti.ro

Hulubești is a commune in Dâmbovița County, Muntenia, Romania. It is composed of five villages: Butoiu de Jos, Butoiu de Sus, Hulubești, Măgura, and Valea Dadei.

Historical population
Year	Pop.	±%
2002	3,465	—
2011	3,101	−10.5%
2021	3,052	−1.6%
Source: Census data
