= Ludești =

- Commune
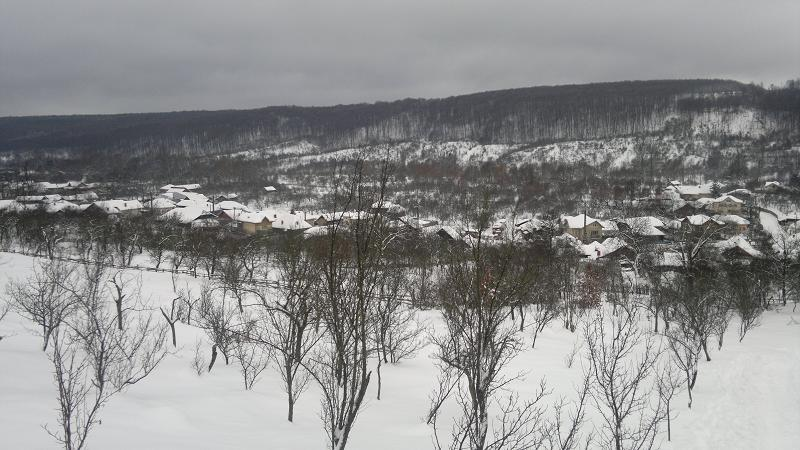
- Scheiu de Jos

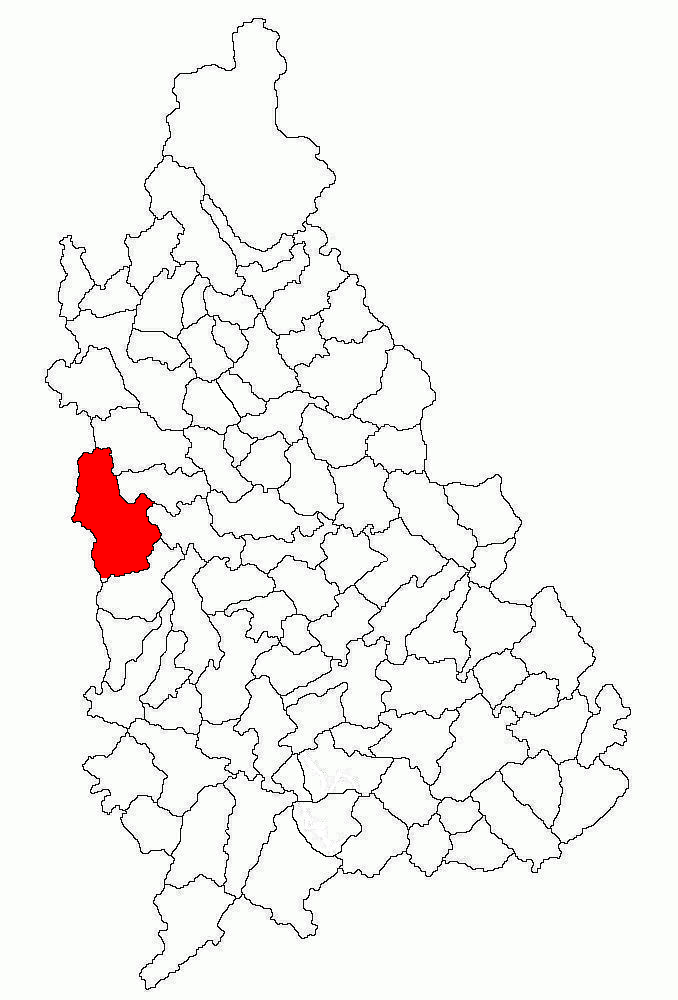
- Location in Dâmbovița County

- Location in Romania
- Coordinates: 44°52′N 25°14′E
- Country: Romania
- County: Dâmbovița

Government
  - Mayor (2020–2024): Laurențiu Mihail Dincă (PSD)
- Area: 88 km^{2} (34 sq mi)
- Elevation: 269 m (883 ft)
- Population (2021-12-01): 5,062
  - Density: 58/km^{2} (150/sq mi)
- Time zone: UTC+02:00 (EET)
  - Summer (DST): UTC+03:00 (EEST)
- Postal code: 137270
- Area code: +(40) 245
- Vehicle reg.: DB
- Website: primarialudesti.ro

Ludești is a commune in Dâmbovița County, Muntenia, Romania with a population of 5,062 as of 2021. It is composed of six villages: Ludești, Miloșari, Potocelu, Scheiu de Jos, Scheiu de Sus, and Telești.

The commune is situated on the Getic Plateau, in between the Wallachian Plain and the Southern Carpathians, at an altitude of 269 m (883 ft), on the banks of the Dâmbovița River. It is located in the western part of Dâmbovița County, 20 km (12 mi) north of the town of Găești and 28 km (17 mi) west of the county seat, Târgoviște, on the border with Argeș County.

Historical population
Year	Pop.	±%
2002	5,078	—
2011	5,137	+1.2%
2021	5,062	−1.5%
Source: Census data
