= Schitu, Olt =

Schitu
- Commune
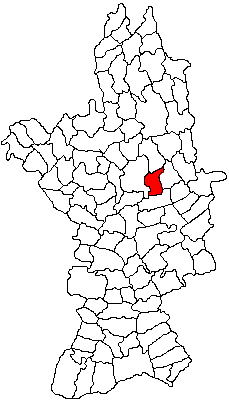
- Location in Olt County

- Location in Romania
- Coordinates: 44°21′N 24°34′E
- Country: Romania
- County: Olt

Government
  - Mayor (2024–2028): Marian Lunganu (PSD)
- Area: 31.94 km^{2} (12.33 sq mi)
- Elevation: 134 m (440 ft)
- Population (2021-12-01): 2,493
  - Density: 78.05/km^{2} (202.2/sq mi)
- Time zone: EET/EEST (UTC+2/+3)
- Postal code: 237400
- Area code: +(40) 249
- Vehicle reg.: OT
- Website: www.primariaschitu.ro

Schitu is a commune in Olt County, Muntenia, Romania. It is composed of five villages: Catanele, Greci, Lisa, Moșteni, and Schitu.
