= Valea Lungă, Dâmbovița =

Valea Lungă
- Commune
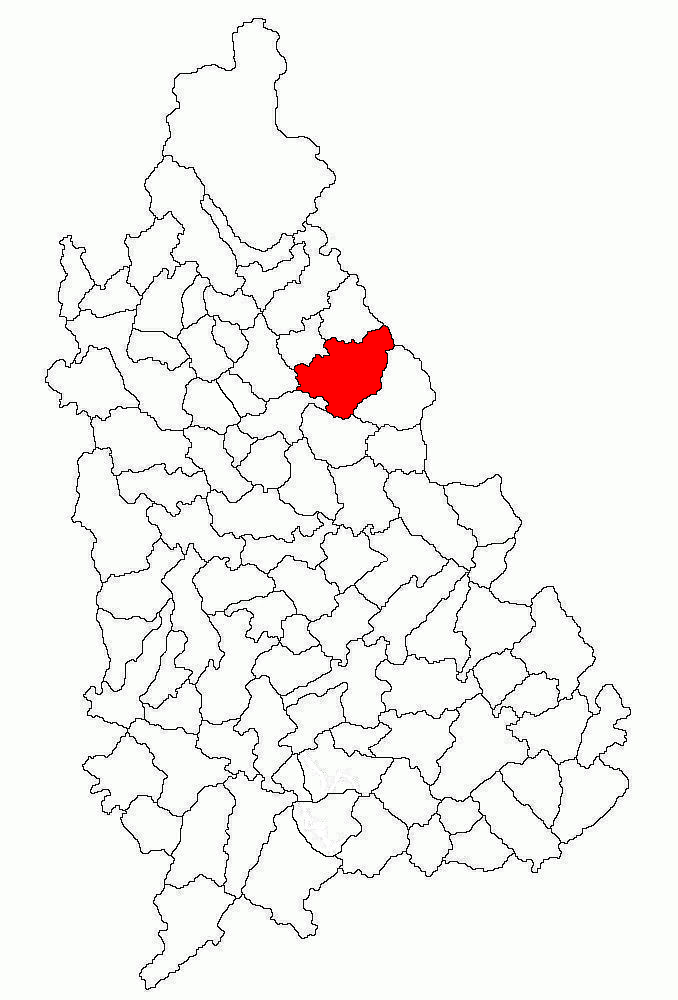
- Location in Dâmbovița County

- Location in Romania
- Coordinates: 45°4′N 25°35′E
- Country: Romania
- County: Dâmbovița

Government
  - Mayor (2020–2024): Emil Negru (PSD)
- Area: 62.72 km^{2} (24.22 sq mi)
- Elevation: 318 m (1,043 ft)
- Population (2021-12-01): 4,518
  - Density: 72/km^{2} (190/sq mi)
- Time zone: EET/EEST (UTC+2/+3)
- Postal code: 137465
- Area code: +(40) 245
- Vehicle reg.: DB
- Website: www.primariavalealunga.ro

Valea Lungă is a commune in Dâmbovița County, Muntenia, Romania with a population of 4,518 people as of 2021. It is composed of ten villages: Băcești, Izvoru, Moșia Mică, Șerbăneasa, Ștubeie Tisa, Valea lui Dan, Valea Lungă-Cricov (the commune center), Valea Lungă-Gorgota, Valea Lungă-Ogrea, and Valea Mare.

Historical population
Year	Pop.	±%
2002	5,174	—
2011	4,770	−7.8%
2021	4,518	−5.3%
Source: Census data
