= Răscăeți =

- Commune
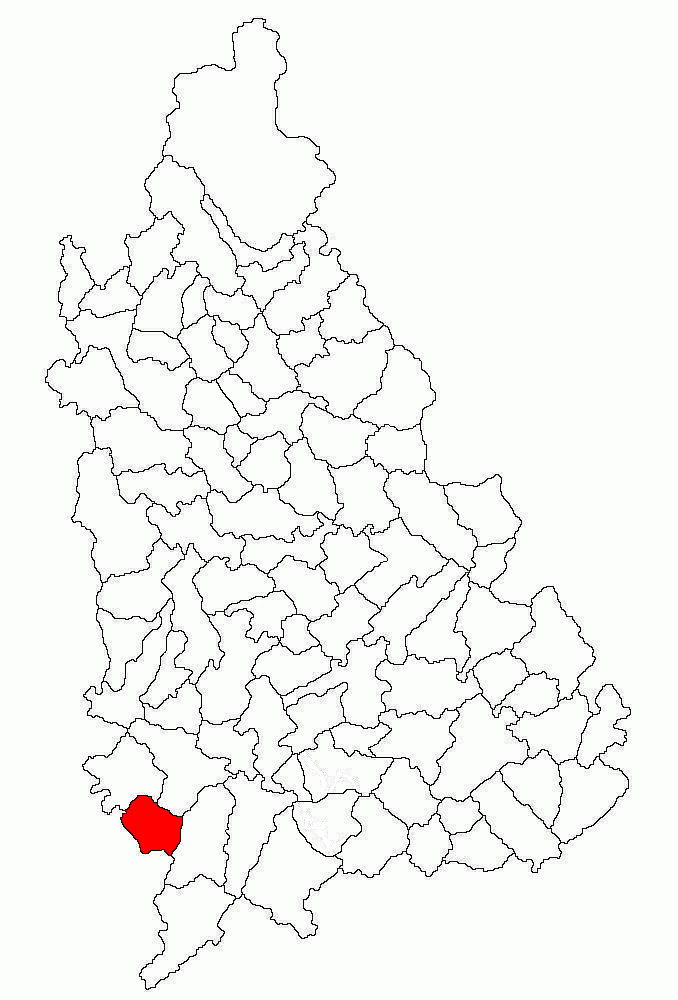
- Location in Dâmbovița County

- Location in Romania
- Coordinates: 44°35′31″N 25°16′11″E
- Country: Romania
- County: Dâmbovița

Government
  - Mayor (2020–2024): Iulian Buibăr (PNL)
- Area: 34.72 km^{2} (13.41 sq mi)
- Elevation: 177 m (581 ft)
- Population (2021-12-01): 2,051
  - Density: 59/km^{2} (150/sq mi)
- Time zone: EET/EEST (UTC+2/+3)
- Postal code: 137518
- Area code: +(40) 245
- Vehicle reg.: DB
- Website: primaria-rascaeti.ro

Răscăeți is a commune in Dâmbovița County, Muntenia, Romania. It is composed of two villages, Răscăeți and Vultureanca.

The commune is situated in the Wallachian Plain, at a mean altitude of 177 m (581 ft). It is located in the southwestern extremity of Dâmbovița County, 16 km (10 mi) from the town of Găești and 43 km (27 mi) from the county seat, Târgoviște, on the border with Argeș County.

Historical population
Year	Pop.	±%
2002	2,367	—
2011	2,241	−5.3%
2021	2,051	−8.5%
Source: Census data
