= Vișinești =

- Commune
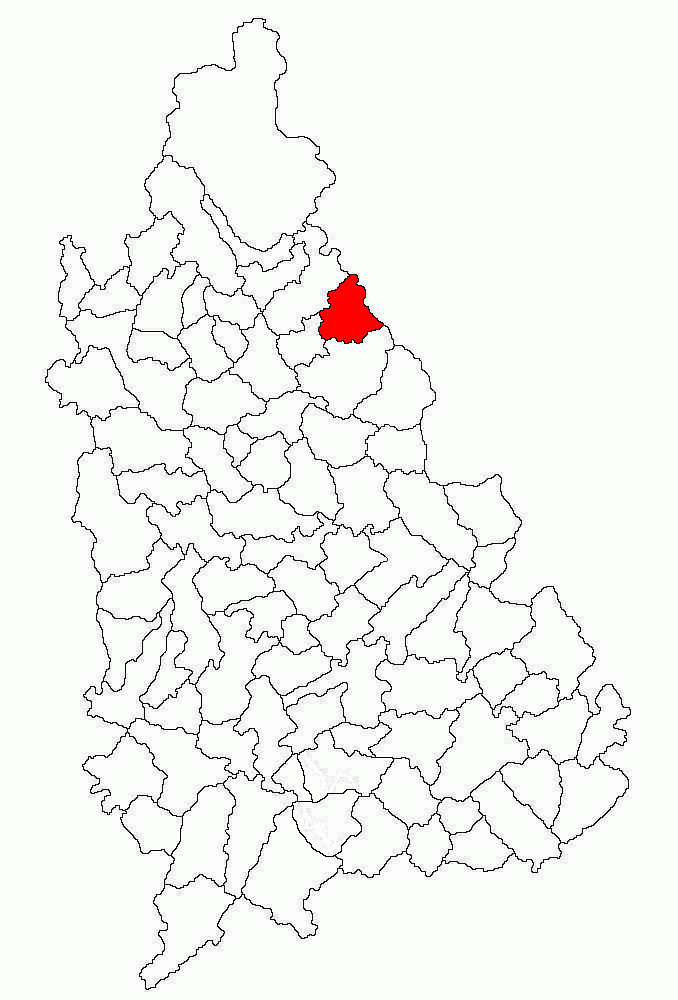
- Location in Dâmbovița County

- Location in Romania
- Coordinates: 45°6′N 25°33′E
- Country: Romania
- County: Dâmbovița

Government
  - Mayor (2024–2028): Nicolae Stoica (PSD)
- Area: 35.78 km^{2} (13.81 sq mi)
- Elevation: 365 m (1,198 ft)
- Population (2021-12-01): 1,586
  - Density: 44/km^{2} (110/sq mi)
- Time zone: EET/EEST (UTC+2/+3)
- Postal code: 137520
- Area code: +(40) 245
- Vehicle reg.: DB
- Website: primariavisinesti.ro

Vișinești is a commune in Dâmbovița County, Muntenia, Romania with a population of 1,586 people as of 2021. It is composed of four villages: Dospinești, Sultanu, Urseiu, and Vișinești.

The commune is located in the northeastern part of the county, on the border with Prahova County. The nearest towns are Pucioasa, 20 km (12 mi) to the west, and Moreni, 20 km to the south; the county seat, Târgoviște, is 45 km (28 mi) to the southwest, while the city of Câmpina is 20 km to the east, in Prahova County.

Historical population
| Year | Pop. | ±% |
|---|---|---|
| 2002 | 2,403 | — |
| 2011 | 1,974 | −17.9% |
| 2021 | 1,586 | −19.7% |
Source: Census data
