= Gura Foii =

- Commune
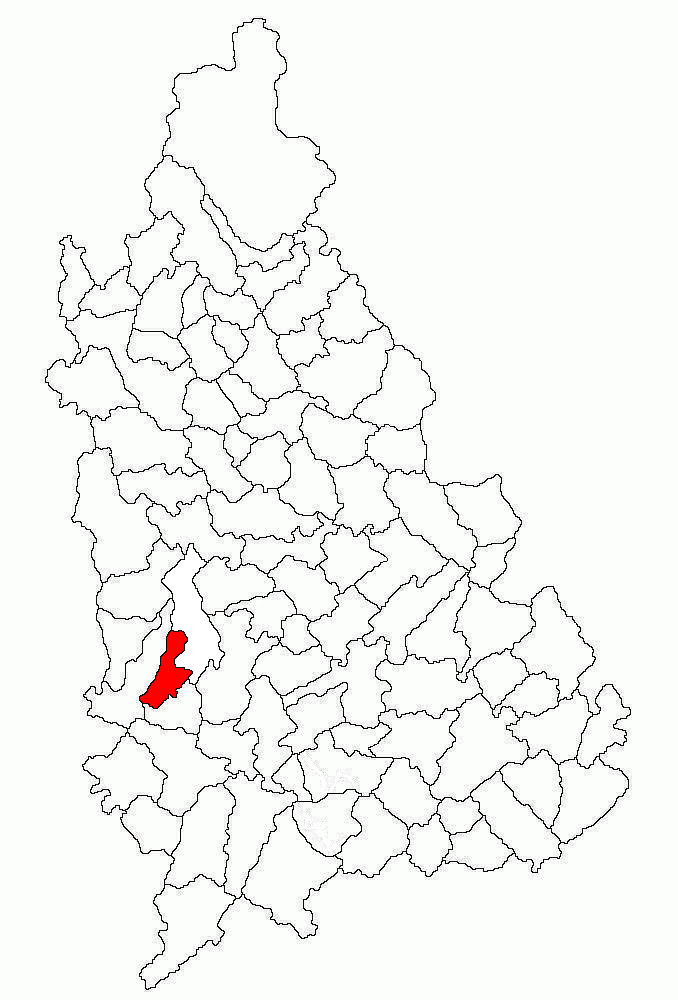
- Location in Dâmbovița County

- Location in Romania
- Coordinates: 44°45′N 25°17′E
- Country: Romania
- County: Dâmbovița

Government
  - Mayor (2024–2028): Radu Nicolae Georgescu (PSD)
- Area: 24.22 km^{2} (9.35 sq mi)
- Elevation: 201 m (659 ft)
- Population (2021-12-01): 2,059
  - Density: 85/km^{2} (220/sq mi)
- Time zone: EET/EEST (UTC+2/+3)
- Postal code: 137235
- Area code: +(40) 245
- Vehicle reg.: DB
- Website: primariagurafoii.ro

Gura Foii is a commune in Dâmbovița County, Muntenia, Romania. It is composed of four villages: Bumbuia, Catanele, Făgetu, and Gura Foii.

Historical population
| Year | Pop. | ±% |
|---|---|---|
| 2002 | 2,347 | — |
| 2011 | 2,140 | −8.8% |
| 2021 | 2,059 | −3.8% |
Source: Census data
