= Uliești =

- Commune
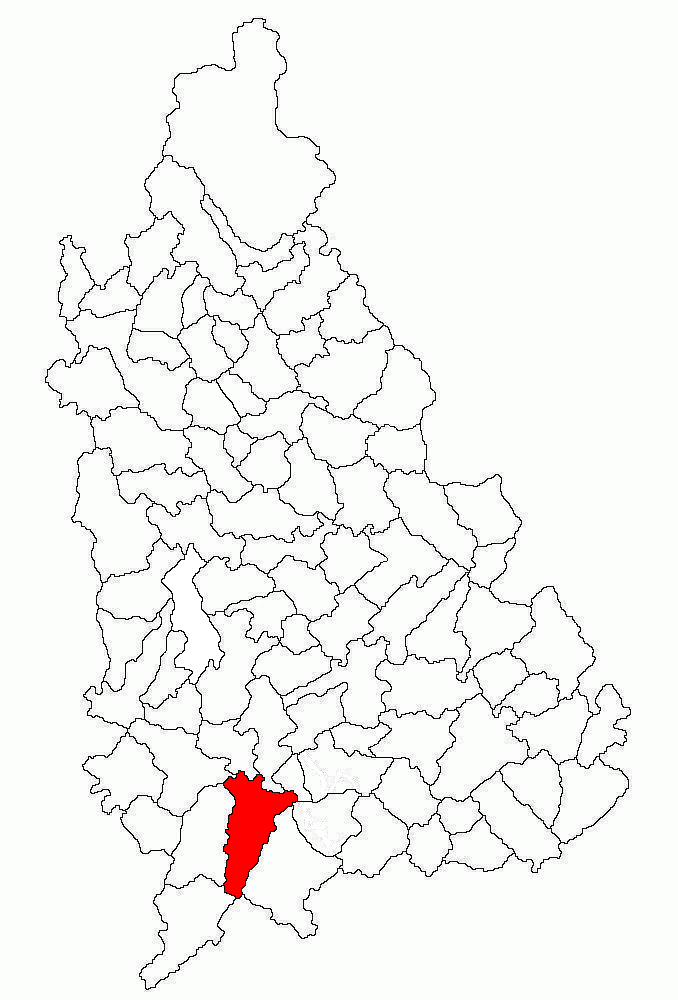
- Location in Dâmbovița County

- Location in Romania
- Coordinates: 44°35′N 25°25′E
- Country: Romania
- County: Dâmbovița

Government
  - Mayor (2024–2028): Iulian-Petrișor Costache (PNL)
- Area: 61.46 km^{2} (23.73 sq mi)
- Elevation: 152 m (499 ft)
- Population (2021-12-01): 3,923
  - Density: 64/km^{2} (170/sq mi)
- Time zone: EET/EEST (UTC+2/+3)
- Postal code: 137445
- Area code: +(40) 245
- Vehicle reg.: DB
- Website: primariauliesti.ro

Uliești is a commune in Dâmbovița County, Muntenia, Romania with a population of 3,923 people as of 2021. It is composed of eight villages: Croitori, Hanu lui Pală, Jugureni, Mănăstioara, Olteni, Ragu, Stavropolia, and Uliești.

The commune lies among an important but non highway route (61) leading to and from Găești. To its northeast runs the river Argeș. Through the heart of the commune runs the river Neajlov.

Historical population
Year	Pop.	±%
2002	4,532	—
2011	4,407	−2.8%
2021	3,923	−11.0%
Source: Census data

== Natives ==
- Constantin Niculae (born 1955), judoka
