= Corbii Mari =

- Commune
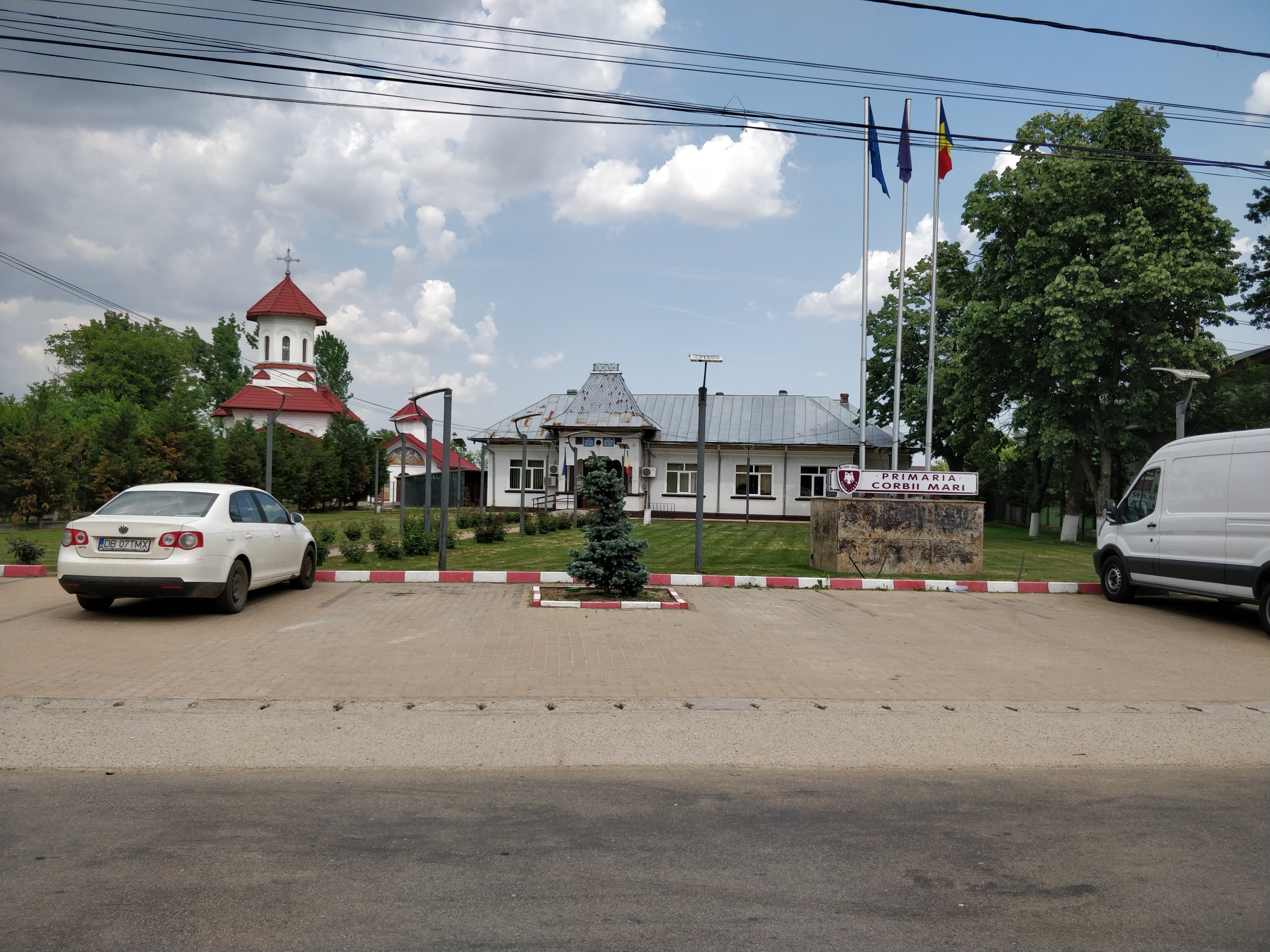
- Church and town hall in Corbii Mari

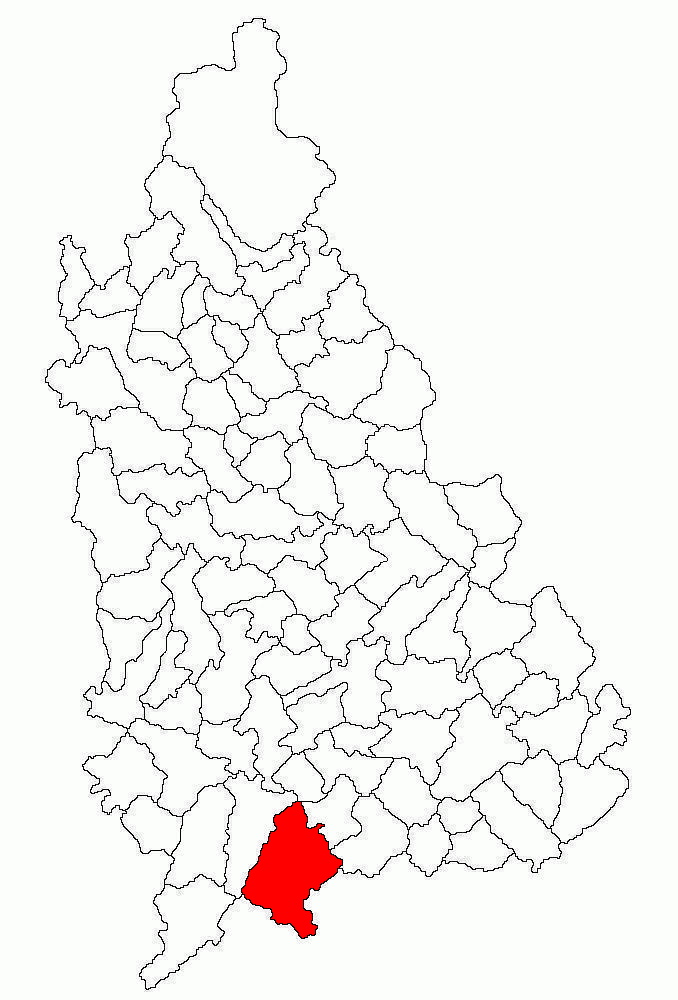
- Location in Dâmbovița County

- Location in Romania
- Coordinates: 44°33′N 25°30′E
- Country: Romania
- County: Dâmbovița

Government
  - Mayor (2024–2028): Ionuț Bănică (PSD)
- Area: 106.17 km^{2} (40.99 sq mi)
- Population (2021-12-01): 8,298
  - Density: 78.16/km^{2} (202.4/sq mi)
- Time zone: UTC+02:00 (EET)
  - Summer (DST): UTC+03:00 (EEST)
- Postal code: 137135
- Vehicle reg.: DB
- Website: primaria-corbiimari.ro

Corbii Mari is a commune in Dâmbovița County, Muntenia, Romania with a population of 8,298 people as of 2021. It is composed of nine villages: Bărăceni, Corbii Mari, Grozăvești, Moara din Groapă, Petrești, Podu Corbencii, Satu Nou, Ungureni, and Vadu Stanchii.

Historical population
Year	Pop.	±%
2002	8,358	—
2011	8,316	−0.5%
2021	8,298	−0.2%
Source: Census data
