= Crângurile =

- Commune
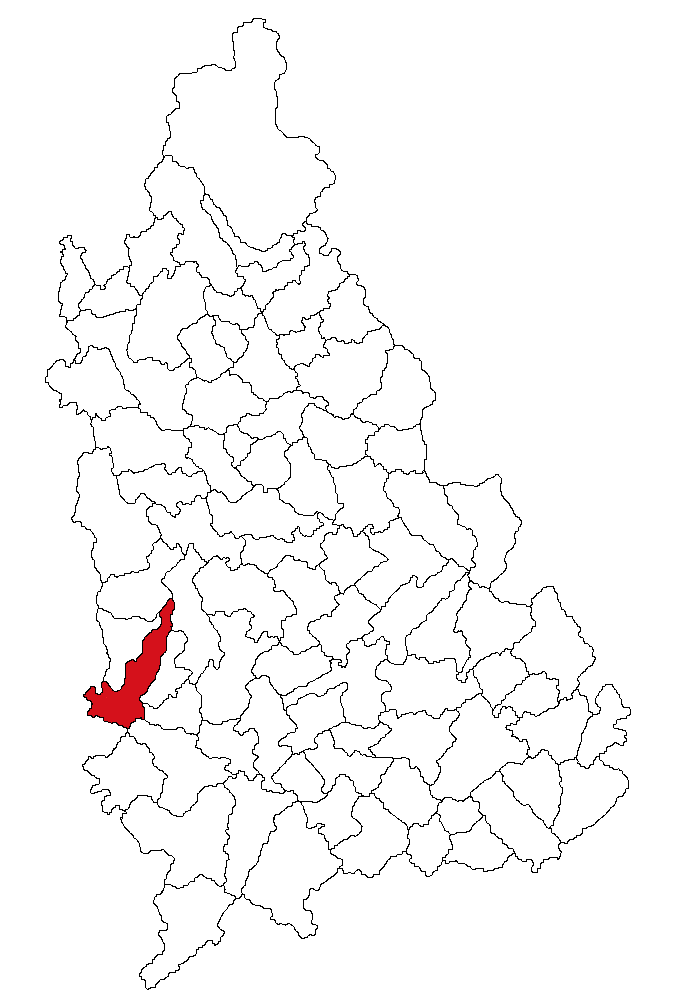
- Location in Dâmbovița County

- Location in Romania
- Coordinates: 44°45′N 25°15′E
- Country: Romania
- County: Dâmbovița

Government
  - Mayor (2020–2024): Costin-Ionuț Barbu (PSD)
- Area: 52.02 km^{2} (20.09 sq mi)
- Elevation: 186 m (610 ft)
- Population (2021-12-01): 3,462
  - Density: 67/km^{2} (170/sq mi)
- Time zone: EET/EEST (UTC+2/+3)
- Postal code: 137171
- Area code: (+40) 02 45
- Vehicle reg.: DB
- Website: primaria-crangurile.ro

Crângurile is a commune in Dâmbovița County, Muntenia, Romania with a population of 3,399 people. It is composed of eight villages: Bădulești (the commune center), Crângurile de Jos, Crângurile de Sus, Pătroaia-Deal, Pătroaia-Vale, Potlogeni-Vale, Rățești, and Voia.

The commune is situated in the Wallachian Plain, at an altitude of 186 m (610 ft), on the banks of the Sabar River. It is located in the western part of Dâmbovița County, 31 km (19 mi) southwest of the county seat, Târgoviște, on the border with Argeș County.

Historical population
Year	Pop.	±%
2002	3,451	—
2011	3,394	−1.7%
2021	3,462	+2.0%
Source: Census data

== Natives ==
- Silvia Radu (born 1935), sculptor, potter, and painter
- Luminița State (1948–2016), mathematician and computer scientist
