= Petrești, Dâmbovița =

Petrești
- Commune
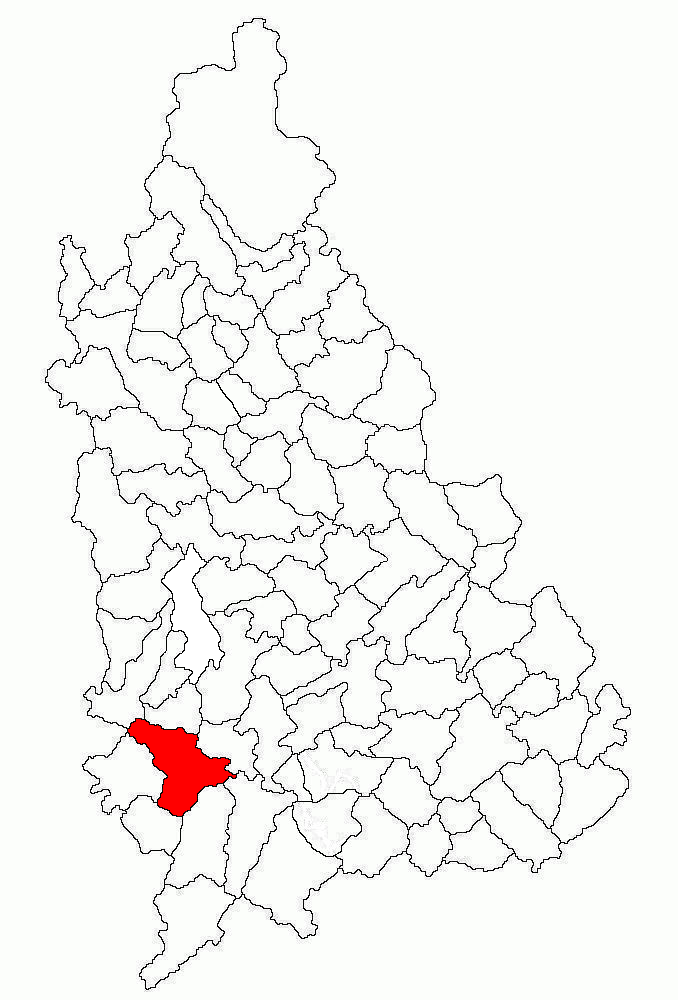
- Location in Dâmbovița County

- Location in Romania
- Coordinates: 44°39′N 25°20′E
- Country: Romania
- County: Dâmbovița

Government
  - Mayor (2024–2028): Lucian Daniel Andrei (PNL)
- Area: 51.98 km^{2} (20.07 sq mi)
- Elevation: 175 m (574 ft)
- Population (2021-12-01): 5,085
  - Density: 97.83/km^{2} (253.4/sq mi)
- Time zone: UTC+02:00 (EET)
  - Summer (DST): UTC+03:00 (EEST)
- Postal code: 137350
- Area code: +(40) 245
- Vehicle reg.: DB
- Website: www.primariapetresti.ro

Petrești is a commune in Dâmbovița County, Muntenia, Romania with a population of 5,085 people as of 2021. It is composed of seven villages: Coada Izvorului, Gherghești, Greci, Ionești, Petrești, Potlogeni-Deal, and Puntea de Greci.

In February 2026, Hanwha Aerospace broke ground on a new armored vehicle production facility in Petrești that will span approximately 181,055 m^{2} (1,948,860 sq ft) and feature advanced assembly lines, performance and validation testing facilities, a 1,751 m (5,745 ft) driving test track, and dedicated R&D laboratories. Named the Hanwha Armored Vehicle Centre of Excellence (H-ACE) Europe, the facility will produce the K9 self-propelled howitzer and the K10 ammunition resupply vehicle.

Historical population
| Year | Pop. | ±% |
|---|---|---|
| 2002 | 6,087 | — |
| 2011 | 5,791 | −4.9% |
| 2021 | 5,085 | −12.2% |
Source: Census data

== Natives ==
- Radu Anghel (1827–1865), Wallachian outlaw
- Elena Ceaușescu (1916–1989), communist activist and First Lady of Romania
- Radu Greceanu (c. 1655/1660–1725), Wallachian chronicler
