= Crevedia Mare =

- Commune
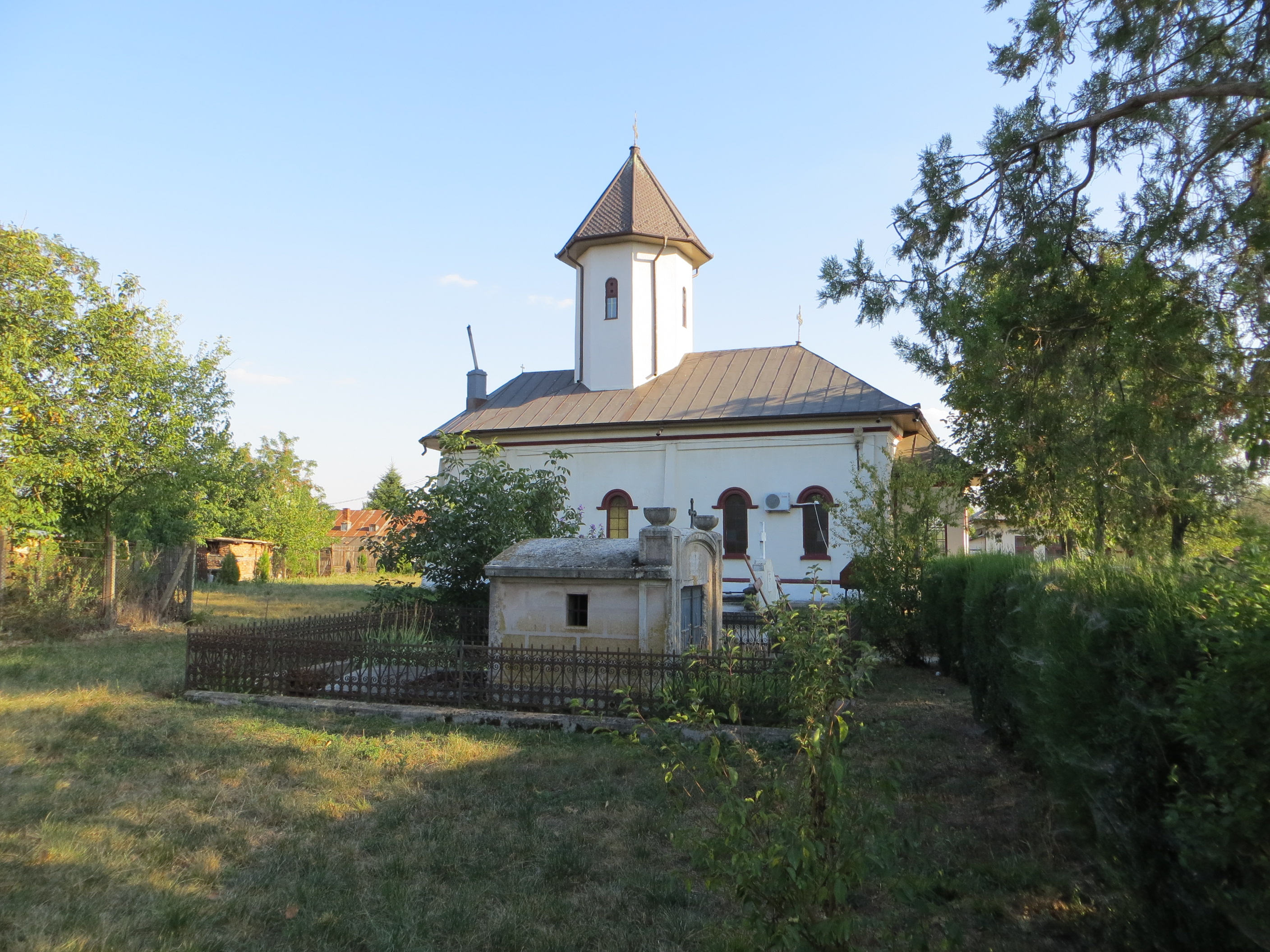
- Saint George's church in Crevedia Mică

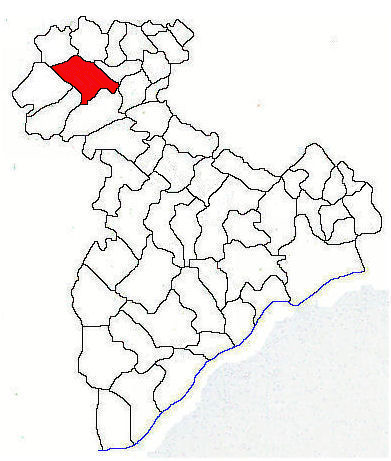
- Location in Giurgiu County

- Location in Romania
- Coordinates: 44°26′N 25°38′E
- Country: Romania
- County: Giurgiu

Government
  - Mayor (2024–2024): Ștefan Daniel Badea (USR)
- Area: 35.27 km^{2} (13.62 sq mi)
- Elevation: 109 m (358 ft)
- Population (2021-12-01): 4,791
  - Density: 135.8/km^{2} (351.8/sq mi)
- Time zone: UTC+02:00 (EET)
  - Summer (DST): UTC+03:00 (EEST)
- Postal code: 87060
- Area code: +(40) 246
- Vehicle reg.: GR
- Website: primariacrevediamare.ro

Crevedia Mare is a commune located in Giurgiu County, Muntenia, Romania.

The commune is located about 20 km (12 mi) west of Bucharest and 2 km south of Trans Europe Motorway E70/A1. It is composed of six villages: Crevedia Mare, Crevedia Mică, Dealu (Golășei until 1964), Găiseanca, Priboiu, and Sfântu Gheorghe.

Historical population
Year	Pop.	±%
2002	4,998	—
2011	5,221	+4.5%
2021	4,791	−8.2%
Source: Census data

== Natives ==
- Nicolae Crevedia (1902–1978), journalist, poet, and novelist
