= Iepurești =

- Commune
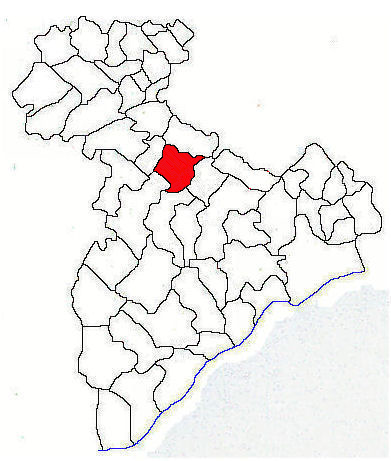
- Location in Giurgiu County

- Location in Romania
- Coordinates: 44°15′30″N 25°53′0″E
- Country: Romania
- County: Giurgiu

Government
  - Mayor (2024–2028): Ion Nanu (PNL)
- Area: 27.22 km^{2} (10.51 sq mi)
- Elevation: 85 m (279 ft)
- Population (2021-12-01): 2,049
  - Density: 75/km^{2} (190/sq mi)
- Time zone: EET/EEST (UTC+2/+3)
- Postal code: 87130
- Area code: +(40) 246
- Vehicle reg.: GR
- Website: comunaiepuresti.ro

Iepurești is a commune located in Giurgiu County, Muntenia, Romania. It is composed of six villages: Bănești, Chirculești, Gorneni, Iepurești, Stâlpu, and Valter Mărăcineanu.

Historical population
Year	Pop.	±%
2002	2,370	—
2011	2,225	−6.1%
2021	2,049	−7.9%
Source: Census data
