= Morteni =

- Commune
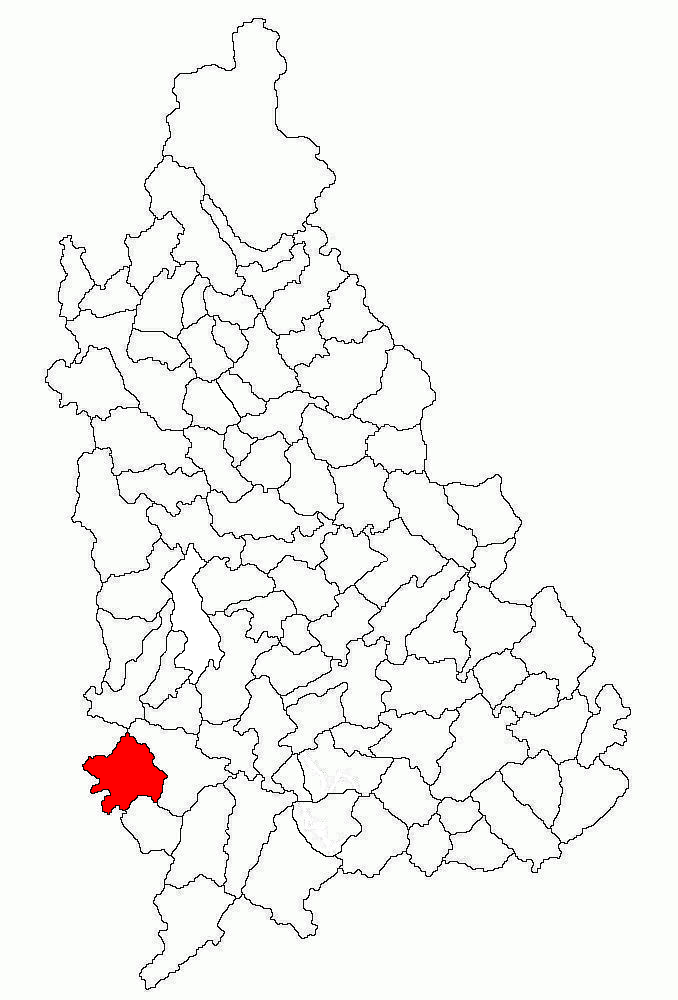
- Location in Dâmbovița County

- Location in Romania
- Coordinates: 44°40′N 25°14′E
- Country: Romania
- County: Dâmbovița

Government
  - Mayor (2024–2028): Ionel Olteanu-Lalu (PSD)
- Area: 53.29 km^{2} (20.58 sq mi)
- Elevation: 192 m (630 ft)
- Population (2021-12-01): 2,564
  - Density: 48/km^{2} (120/sq mi)
- Time zone: EET/EEST (UTC+2/+3)
- Postal code: 137320
- Area code: +(40) 245
- Vehicle reg.: DB
- Website: primaria-morteni.ro

Morteni is a commune in Dâmbovița County, Muntenia, Romania with a population of 2,564 people as of 2021. It is composed of two villages, Morteni and Neajlovu (until 1964 Cacova).

Historical population
Year	Pop.	±%
2002	3,117	—
2011	3,042	−2.4%
2021	2,564	−15.7%
Source: Census data
