= Dâmbovița County =

County of Romania

Dâmbovița County Județul Dâmbovița
- County
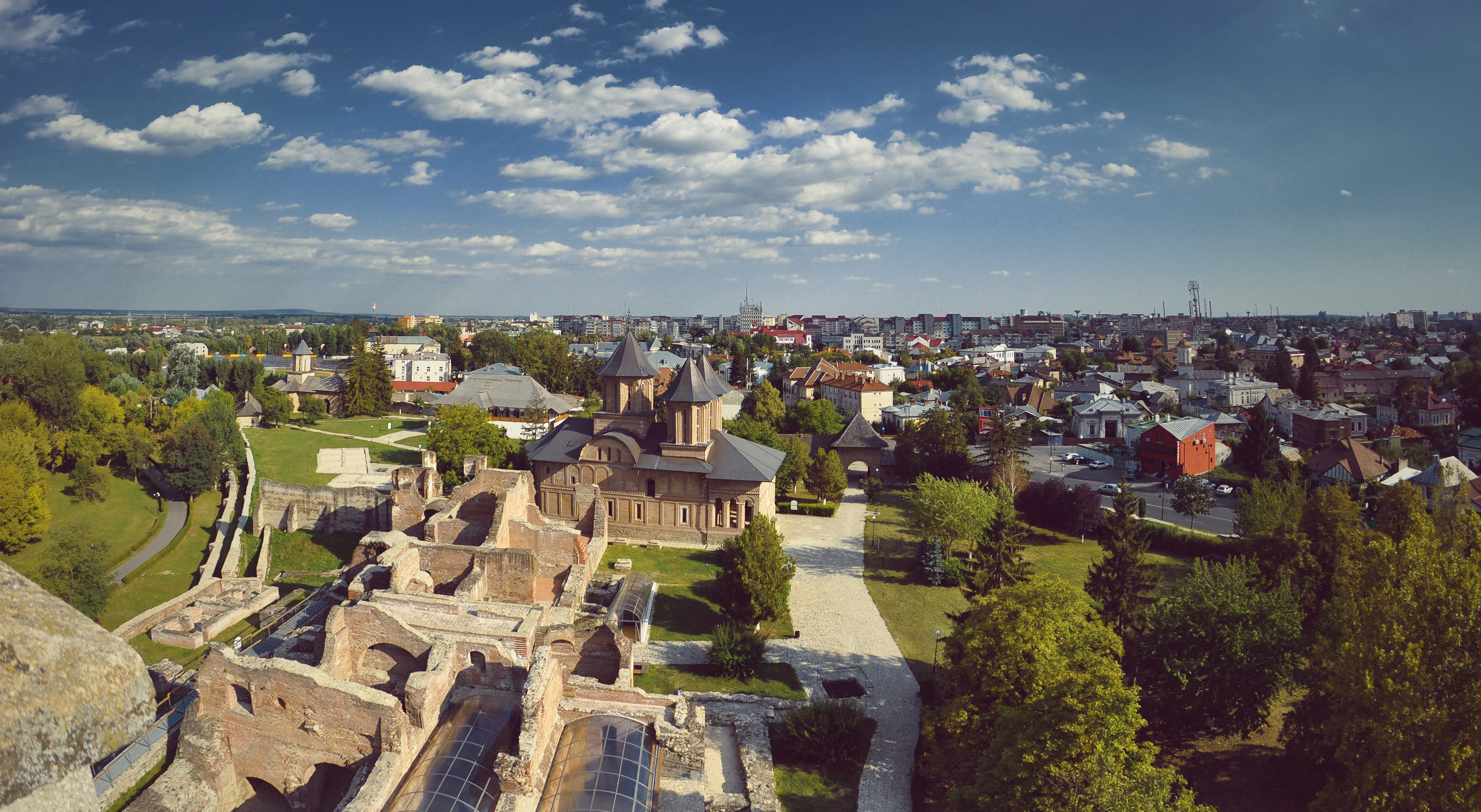
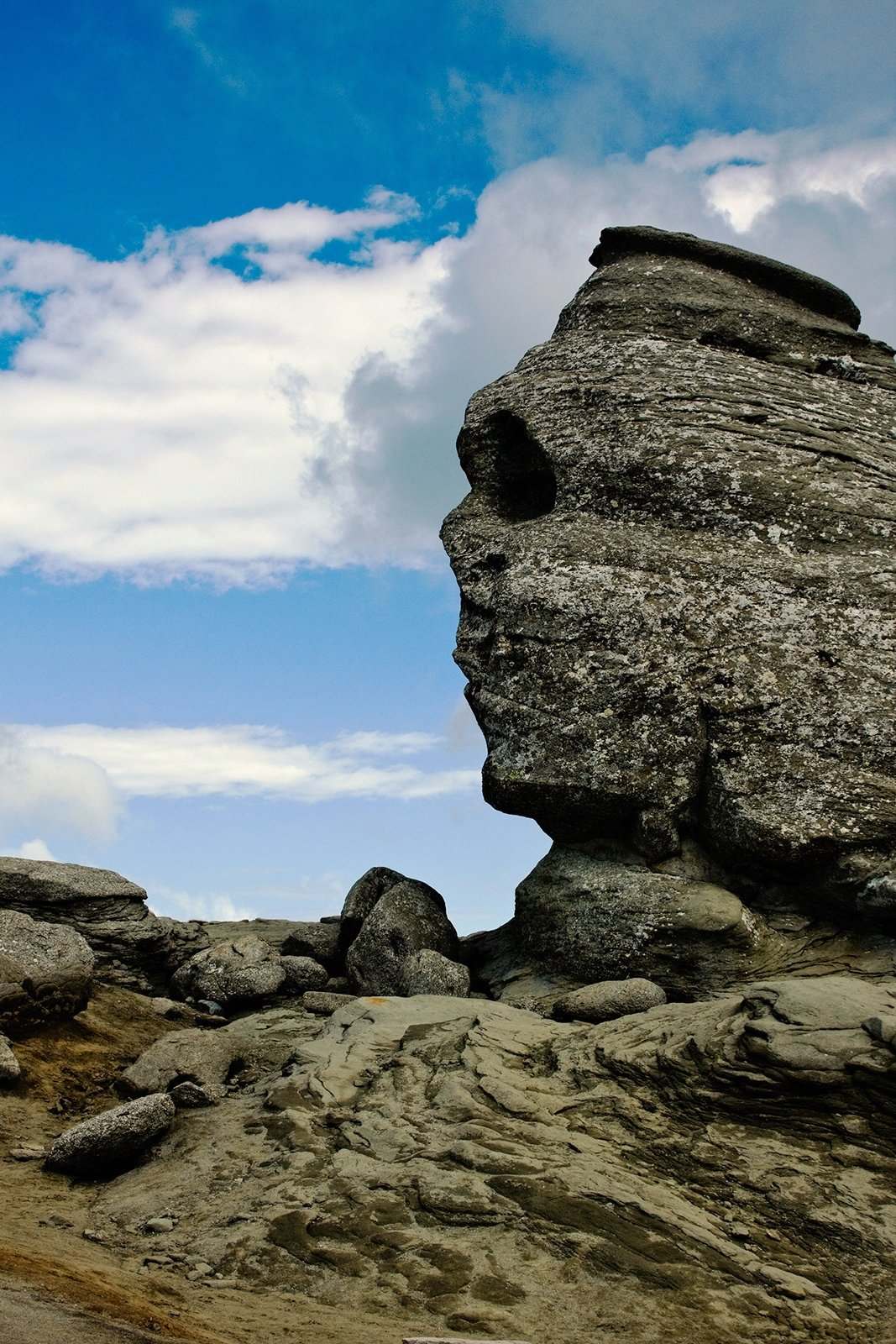
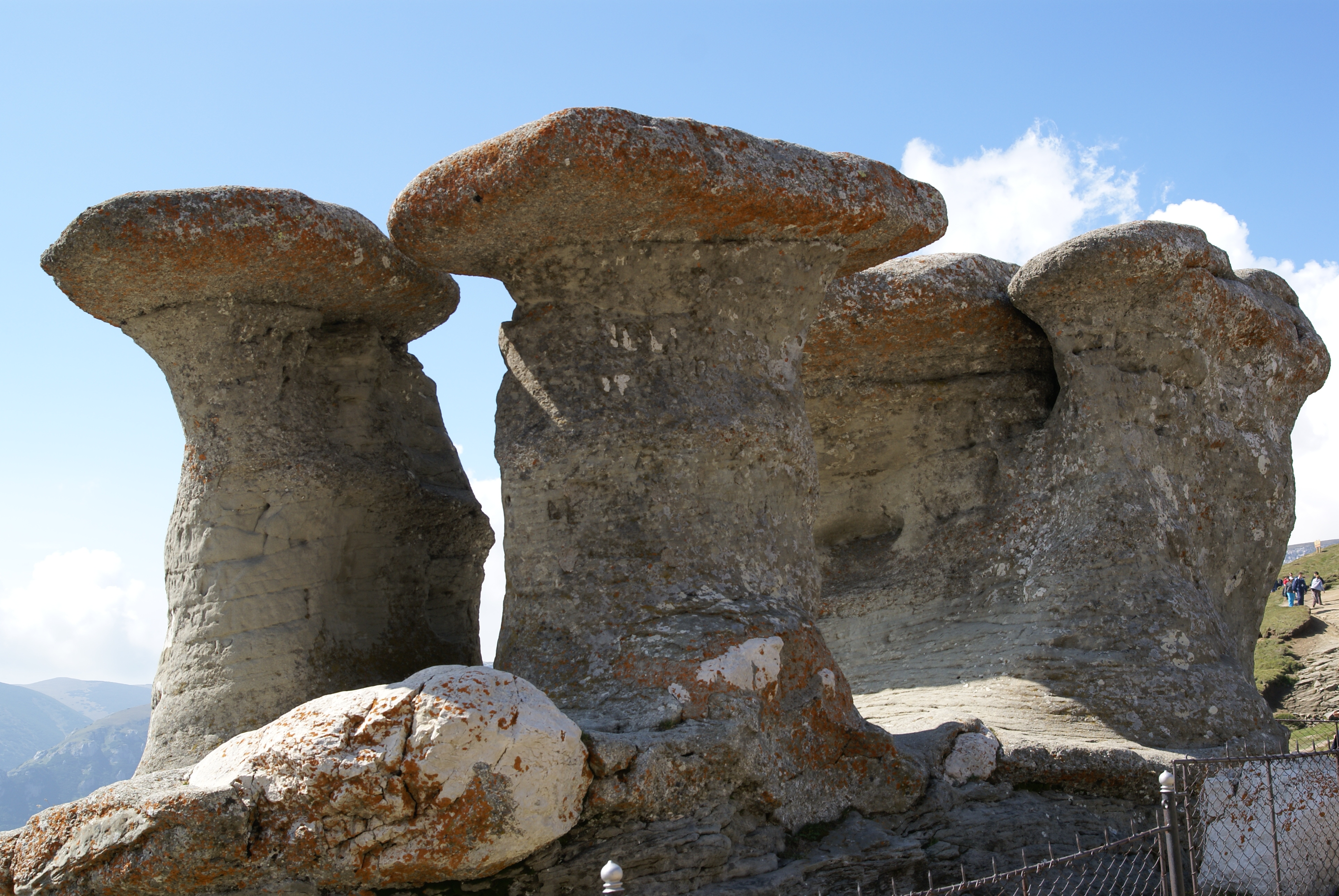
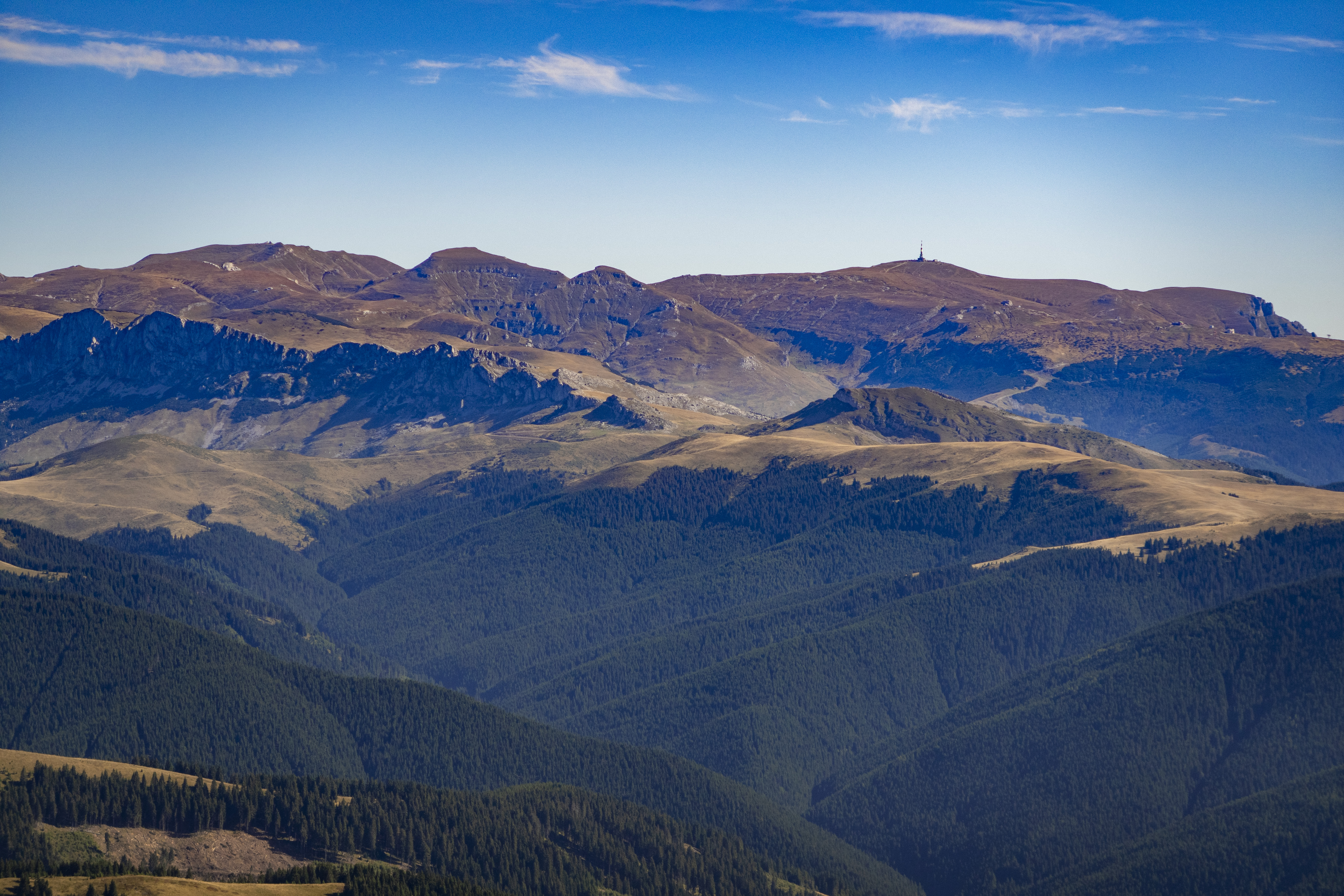
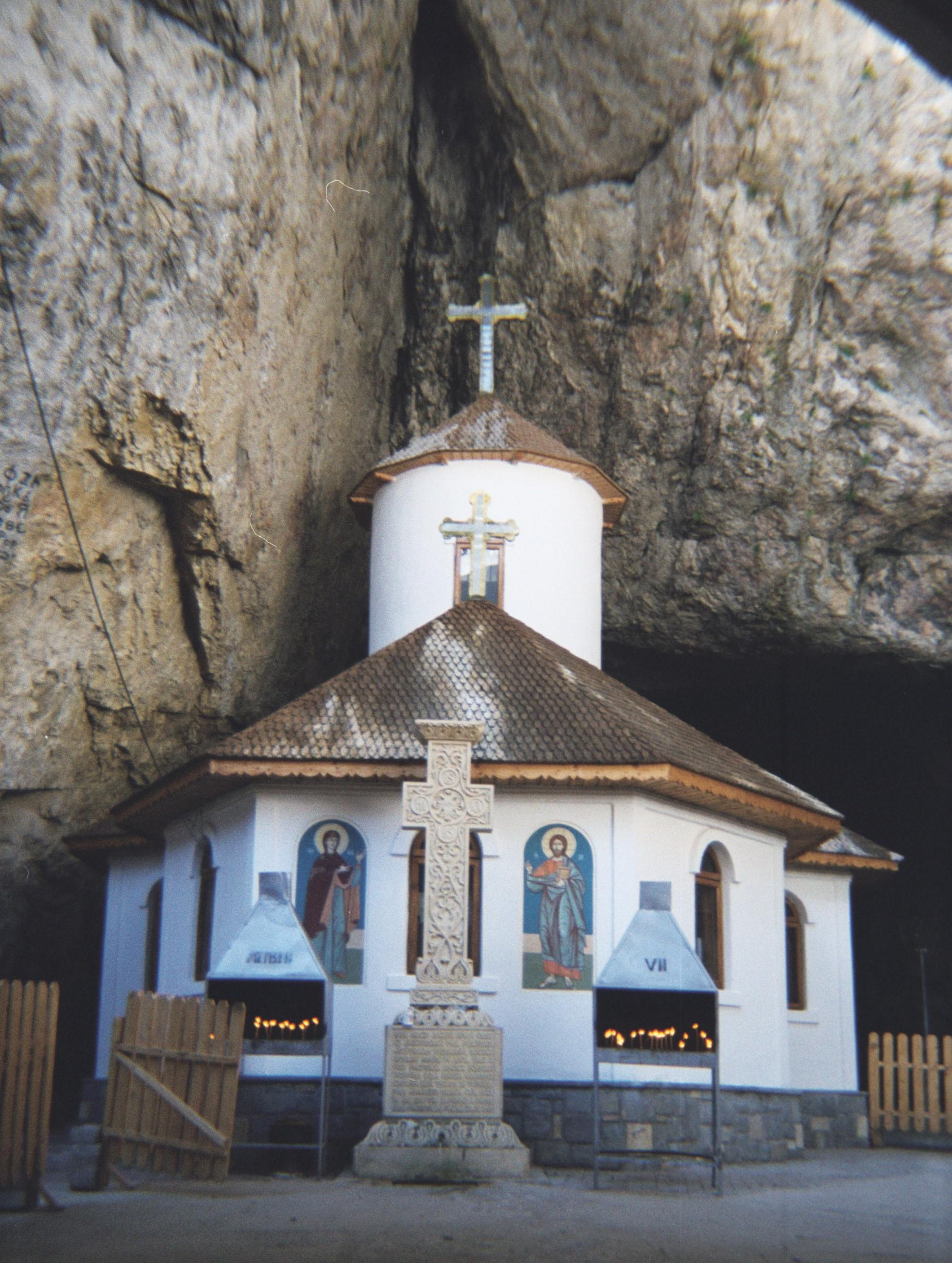
- Târgoviște Bucegi Sphinx Babele Leaota Mountains Ialomiței Cave

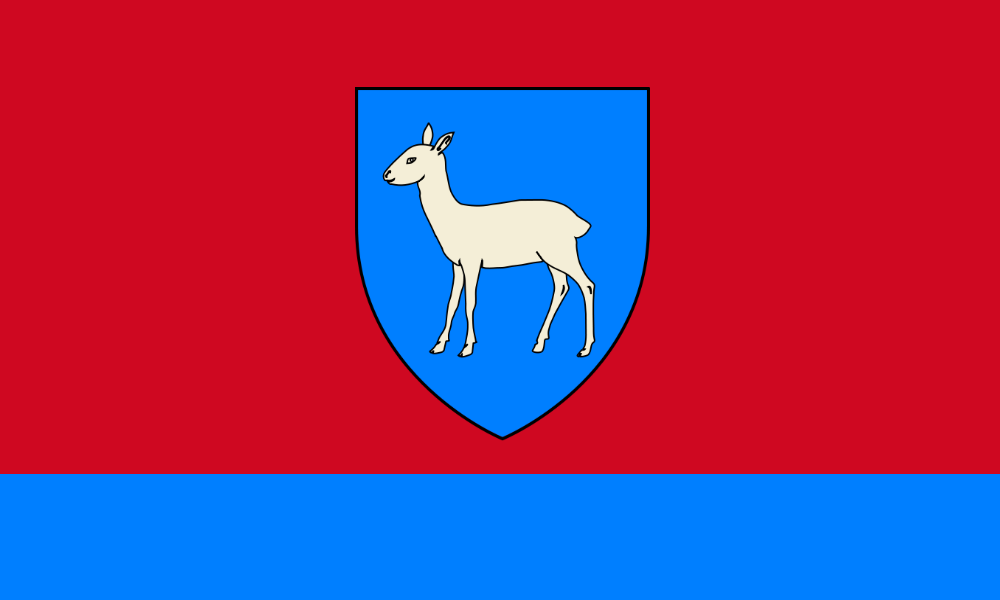
- Flag Coat of arms

- Coordinates: 44.89°N 25.47°E
- Country: Romania
- Development region^{1}: Sud
- Historic region: Muntenia
- Capital city (Reședință de județ): Târgoviște

Government
  - Type: County Council
  - President of the County Council: Ștefan Corneliu (PSD)
  - Prefect^{2}: Claudia Gilia

Area
  - Total: 4,054 km^{2} (1,565 sq mi)
  - Rank: 37th in Romania

Population (2021-12-01)
  - Total: 479,404
  - Rank: 15th in Romania
  - Density: 118.3/km^{2} (306.3/sq mi)
- Time zone: UTC+2 (EET)
  - Summer (DST): UTC+3 (EEST)
- Postal Code: 13wxyz^{3}
- Area code: +40 x45^{4}
- Car Plates: DB^{5}
- GDP: US$3.153 billion (2015)
- GDP per capita: US$6,078 (2015)
- Website: County Board; County Prefecture
- ^{1}The development regions of Romania have no administrative role. They were formed to attract funds from the European Union^{2}. As of 2007, the Prefect is not a politician, but a public functionary. He (or she) is not allowed to be a member of a political party, and is banned to have any political activity in the first six months after the resignation (or exclusion) from the public functionary corps^{3}w, x, y, and z are digits that indicate the city, the street, part of the street, or even the building of the address^{4}x is a digit indicating the operator: 2 for the former national operator, Romtelecom, and 3 for the other ground telephone networks^{5}used on both the plates of the vehicles that operate only in the county limits (like utility vehicles, ATVs, etc.), and the ones used outside the county

Dâmbovița County (Romanian pronunciation: [ˈdɨmbovitsa]; also spelt Dîmbovița) is a county (județ) of Romania, in Muntenia, with the capital city at Târgoviște, the most important economic, political, administrative, and cultural center of the county. It is a traditional administrative unit, first attested in 1512.

== Demographics ==
In 2021, it had a population of 479,404, and the population density was 120/km^{2}. It is one of the most densely populated counties in Romania.

- Romanians – 87.09%
- Roma - 3.96%
- Bulgarians - 0.31%
- Serbians 0.1%
- Others - 0.13%
- Unknown - 8.41%

Year	County population
1948	409,272
1956	438,985 ▲
1966	453,241 ▲
1977	527,620 ▲
1992	559,874 ▲
2002	541,763 ▼
2011	518,745 ▼
2021	479,404 ▼

== Name ==
The county is named after the Dâmbovița River, a name of Slavic origin derived from Дъб, dâmb, meaning "oak," as it once flowed through the oak forests of the Wallachian Plain.

== Geography ==
Dâmbovița county has a total area of 4,054 km^{2} (1.7% of the country's surface). It is situated in the south-central part of the country, on the Ialomița and Dâmbovița river basins.

The highest altitude is Omu Peak (2505 m) in the Bucegi Mountains, while the lowest is between 120–125 m, in the Titu Plain. The administrative units of the county are: 2 municipalities, 5 cities, 82 communes, all encompassing an additional 361 villages.

=== Neighbouring counties ===
- Brașov County in the North.
- Prahova County in the East.
- Ilfov County in the South-East.
- Teleorman County and Giurgiu County in the South.
- Argeș County in the West.

== Economy ==
One of the biggest steel factories in Romania is located in Târgoviște. Also, oil is extracted and refined in the county.

The predominant industries in the county are:

- Metallurgical industry.
- Oil extraction equipment.
- Food industry.
- Home appliances.
- Textile industry.
- Chemical industry.
- Construction materials industry.

== Tourism ==
The main tourist destinations are:

- The city of Târgoviște – the ancient capital of Muntenia.
- The Pucioasa Resort.
- The Ialomița River Valley - filled with holiday resorts, camping sites, waterfalls, and natural reserves.
- The Babele and Bucegi Sphinx.

== Trivia ==
- Glod, a small village in this area, was used to represent Kazakhstan in the filming of the mockumentary movie Borat: Cultural Learnings of America for Make Benefit Glorious Nation of Kazakhstan.
- Its capital, Târgoviște, was the seat of Vlad the Impaler, the namesake of Bram Stoker's Dracula.

== Politics ==
The Dâmbovița County Council, renewed at the 2024 local elections, consists of 34 councilors, with the following party composition:

Party	Seats	Current County Council
Social Democratic Party (PSD)	22	
National Liberal Party (PNL)	9	
Alliance for the Union of Romanians (AUR)	3	

== Administrative divisions ==
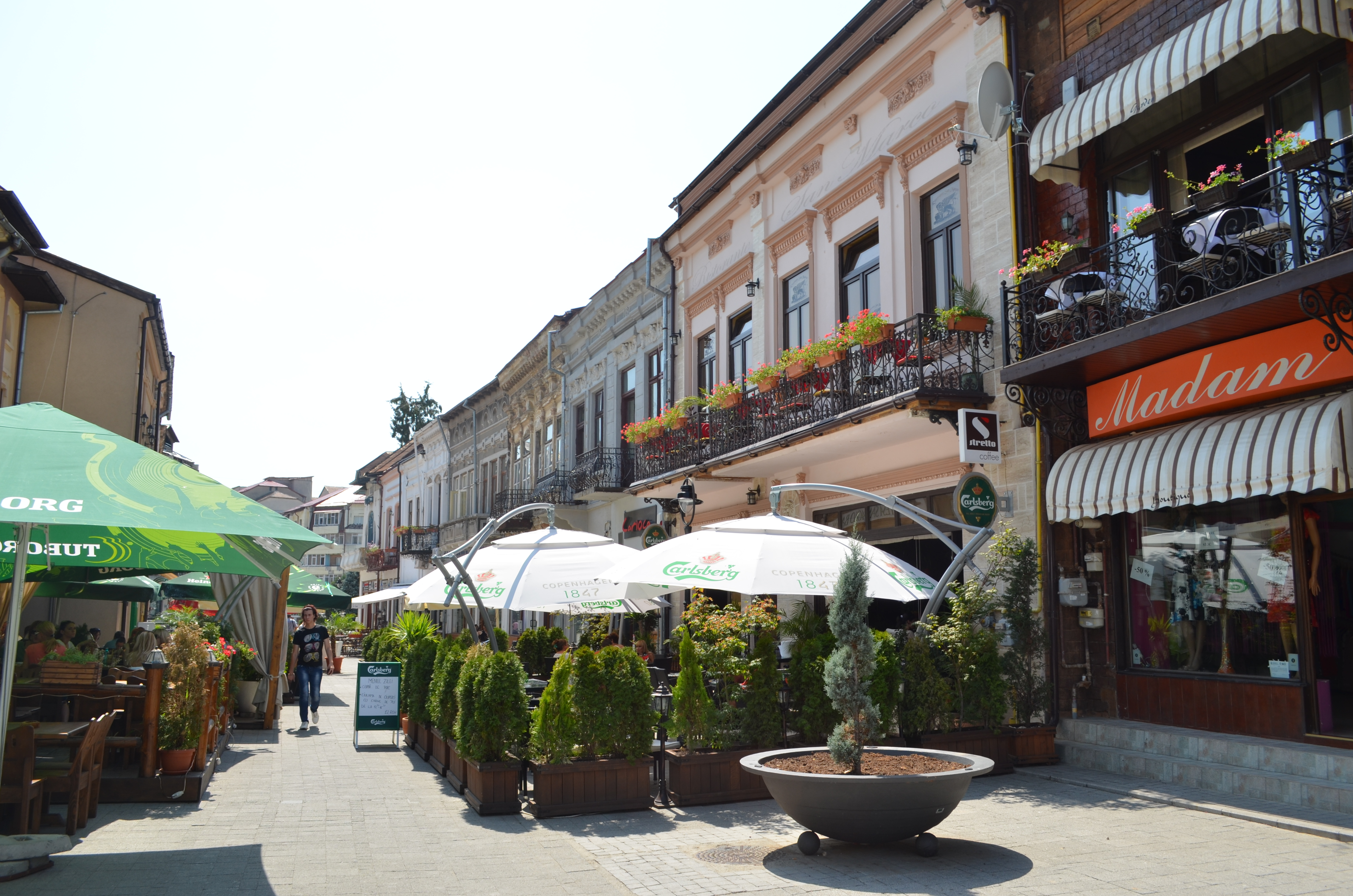
Târgoviște

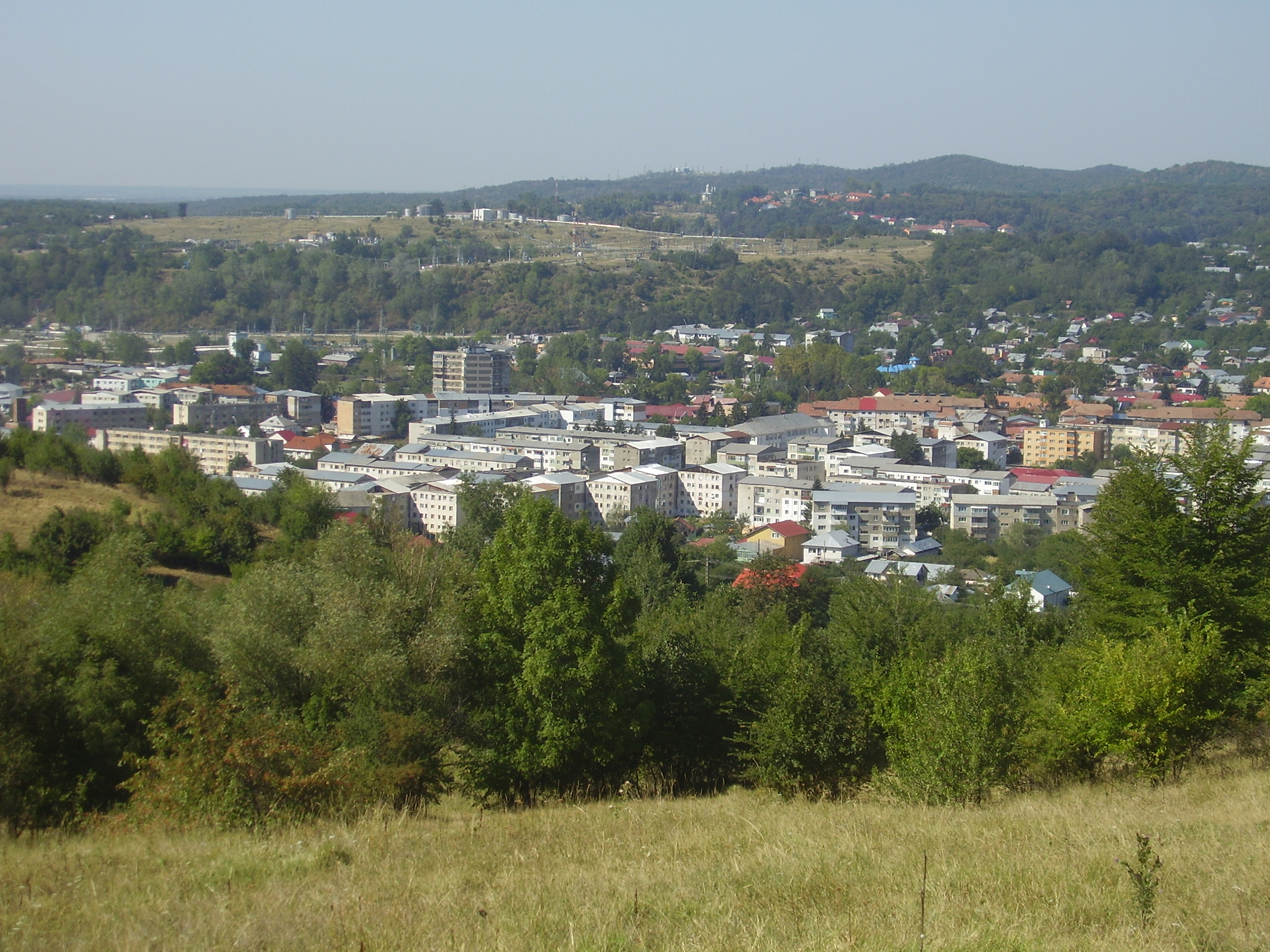
Moreni

Dâmbovița County 2 municipalities, 5 towns and 82 communes

- Municipalities
  - Moreni
  - Târgoviște – county seat; population: 79,610 (as of 2011)
- Towns
  - Fieni
  - Găești
  - Pucioasa
  - Răcari
  - Titu
- Communes
  - Aninoasa
  - Băleni
  - Bărbulețu
  - Bezdead
  - Bilciurești
  - Braniștea
  - Brănești
  - Brezoaele
  - Buciumeni
  - Bucșani
  - Butimanu
  - Cândești
  - Ciocănești
  - Cobia
  - Cojasca
  - Comișani
  - Conțești
  - Corbii Mari
  - Cornățelu
  - Cornești
  - Costeștii din Vale
  - Crângurile
  - Crevedia
  - Dărmănești
  - Dobra
  - Doicești
  - Dragodana
  - Dragomirești
  - Finta
  - Glodeni
  - Gura Foii
  - Gura Ocniței
  - Gura Șuții
  - Hulubești
  - I. L. Caragiale
  - Iedera
  - Lucieni
  - Ludești
  - Lungulețu
  - Malu cu Flori
  - Mănești
  - Mătăsaru
  - Mogoșani
  - Moroeni
  - Morteni
  - Moțăieni
  - Niculești
  - Nucet
  - Ocnița
  - Odobești
  - Perșinari
  - Pietrari
  - Petrești
  - Pietroșița
  - Poiana
  - Potlogi
  - Produlești
  - Pucheni
  - Raciu
  - Răscăeți
  - Răzvad
  - Râu Alb
  - Runcu
  - Sălcioara
  - Slobozia Moară
  - Șelaru, Dâmbovița
  - Șotânga
  - Tărtășești
  - Tătărani
  - Uliești
  - Ulmi
  - Văcărești
  - Valea Lungă
  - Valea Mare
  - Văleni-Dâmbovița
  - Vârfuri
  - Vișina
  - Vișinești
  - Vlădeni
  - Voinești
  - Vulcana-Băi
  - Vulcana-Pandele

== Historical county ==
Județul Dâmbovița
- County (Județ)
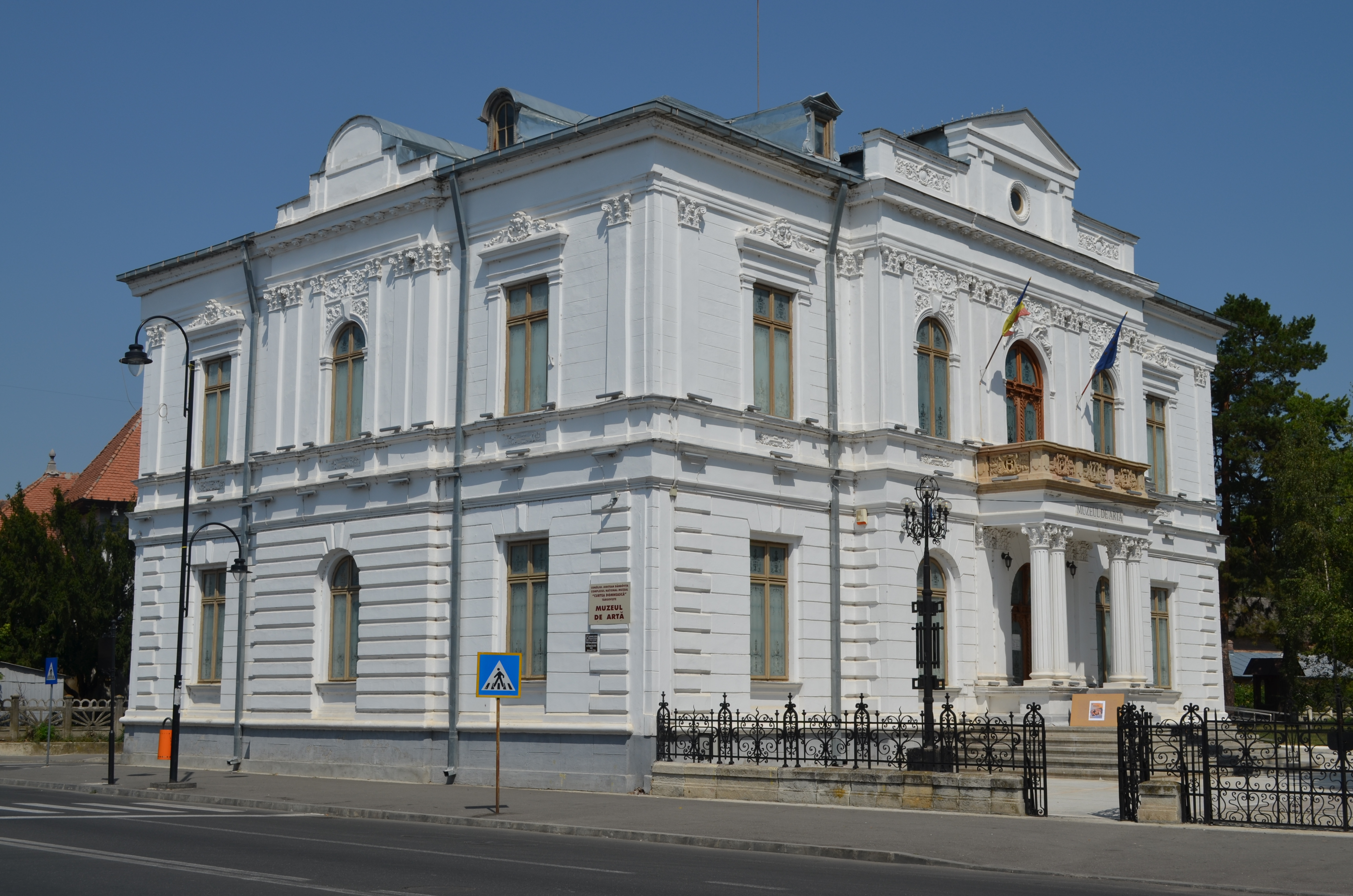
- The Dâmbovița County prefecture building from the interwar period, now an art museum.

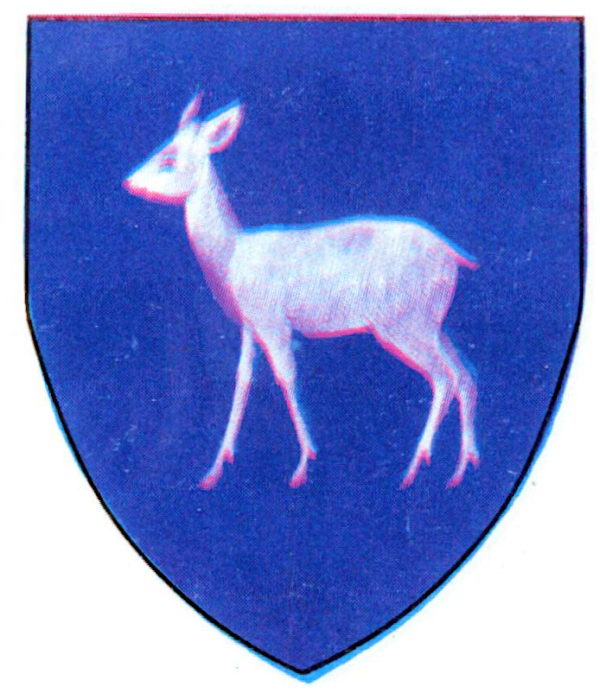
- Coat of arms

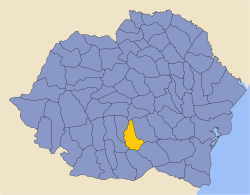
- Country: Romania
- Historic region: Muntenia
- Capital city (Reședință de județ): Târgoviște

Area
  - Total: 3,440 km^{2} (1,330 sq mi)

Population (1930)
  - Total: 310,310
  - Density: 90.2/km^{2} (234/sq mi)
- Time zone: UTC+2 (EET)
  - Summer (DST): UTC+3 (EEST)

Historically, the county was located in the central-southern part of Greater Romania, in the northern part of the historical region of Muntenia. The county included a large part of the present county. It was bordered to the west by the counties of Muscel and Argeș, to the north by Brașov County, to the east by Prahova County, and to the south by the counties of Ilfov and Vlașca.

=== Administration ===
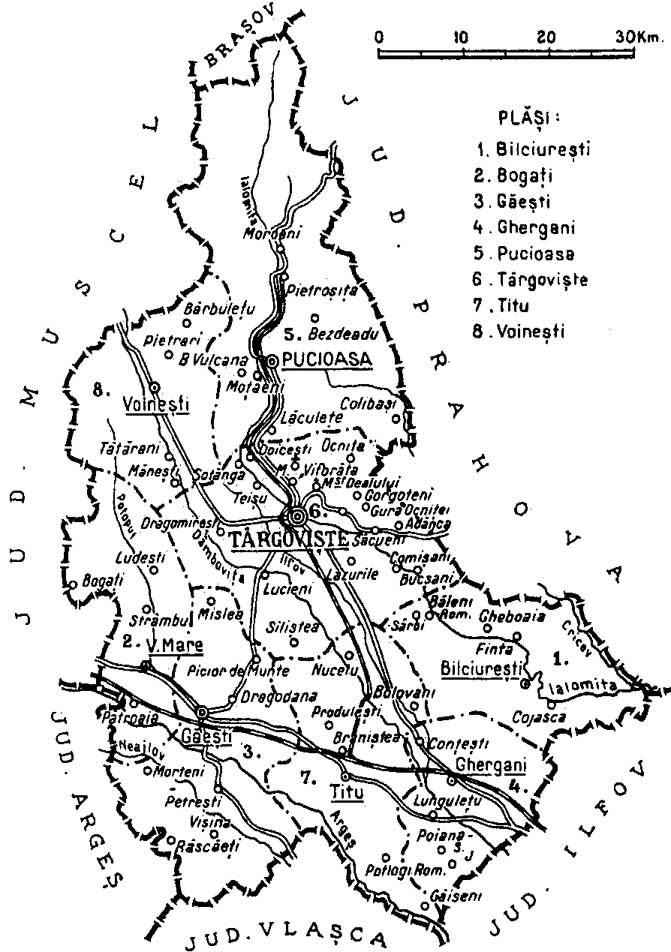
Map of Dâmbovița County as constituted in 1938.

The county was originally divided administratively into six districts (plăși):

1. Plasa Finta, headquartered at Finta
2. Plasa Găești, headquartered at Găești
3. Plasa Pucioasa, headquartered at Pucioasa
4. Plasa Târgoviște, headquartered at Târgoviște
5. Plasa Titu, headquartered at Titu
6. Plasa Voinești, headquartered at Voinești

Subsequently, the territory of the county was reorganized into eight districts by the abolition of Plasa Finta and the establishment of three new districts in its place:

1. Plasa Bilciurești, headquartered at Bilciurești
2. Plasa Bogați, headquartered at Bogați
3. Plasa Ghergani, headquartered at Ghergani

=== Population ===
According to the 1930 census data, the county population was 309,676 inhabitants, ethnically divided as follows: 96.9% Romanians, 2.1% Romanies, 0.2% Jews, 0.2% Hungarians, 0.1% Germans, as well as other minorities. From the religious point of view, the population was 98.9% Eastern Orthodox, 0.3% Roman Catholic, 0.3% Jewish, 0.1% Adventist, 0.1% Greek Catholic, as well as other minorities.

==== Urban population ====
In 1930, the county's urban population was 33,398 inhabitants, comprising 63.2% Romanians, 2.0% Jews, 1.3% Romanies, 1.2% Hungarians, 0.5% Greeks, as well as other minorities. From the religious point of view, the urban population was composed of 94.8% Eastern Orthodox, 2.1% Jewish, 1.5% Roman Catholic, 0.6% Greek Catholic, 0.3% Calvinist, 0.3% Lutheran, as well as other minorities.
