= Târgoviște Art Museum =

Coordinates: 44.930802°N 25.460069°E

- Muzeul de Artă din Târgoviște
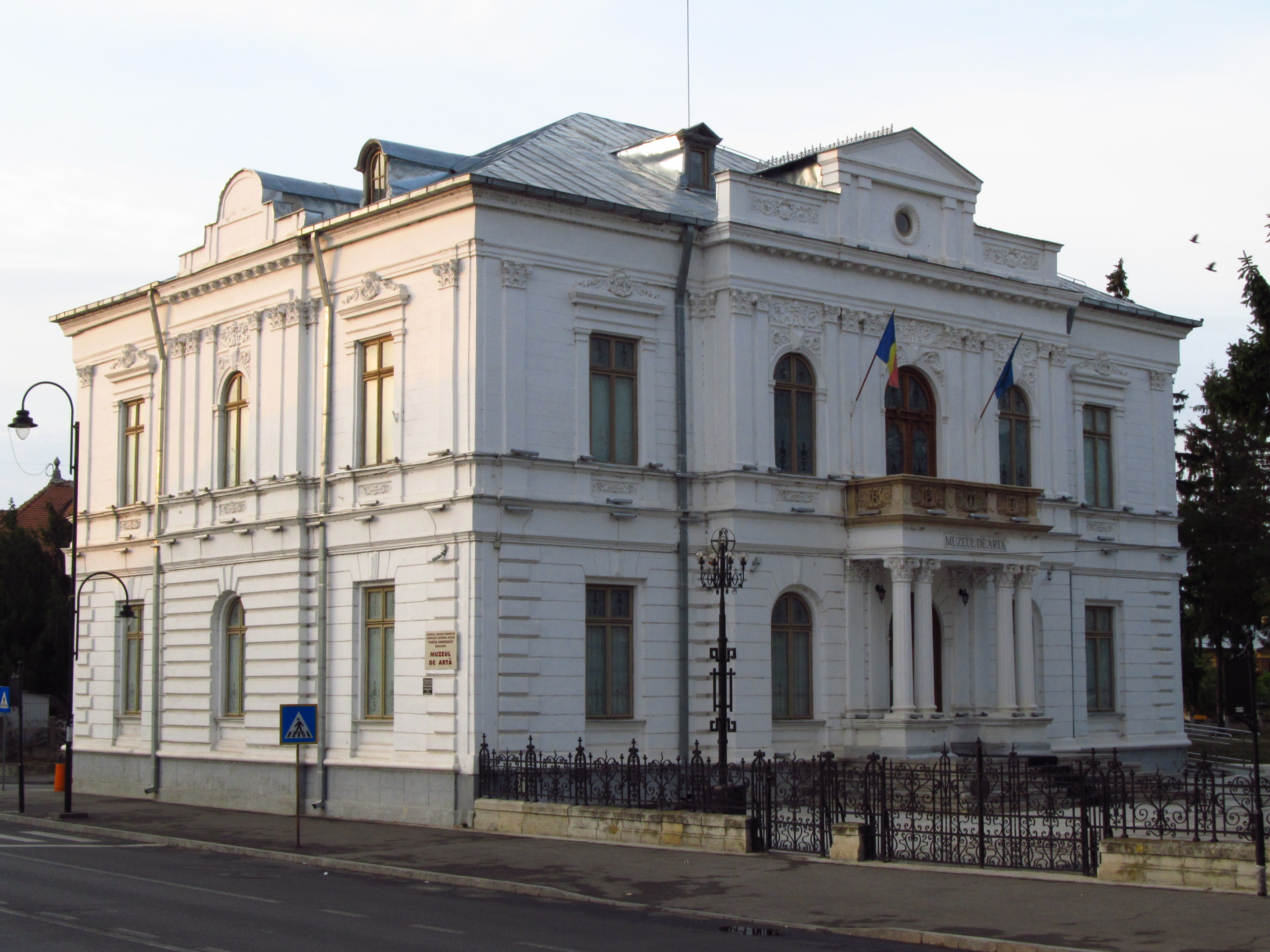
- Established: 1971
- Location: Calea Domnească nr. 185, Târgoviște, Romania
- Type: Art museum
- Director: Ovidiu Cârstina
- Website: http://www.muzee-dambovitene.ro/

The Târgoviște Art Museum (Romanian: Muzeul de Artă din Târgoviște) is situated on Calea Domnească Târgoviște, Romania, in close proximity to the Museum of History and the Princely Court.

== Building ==
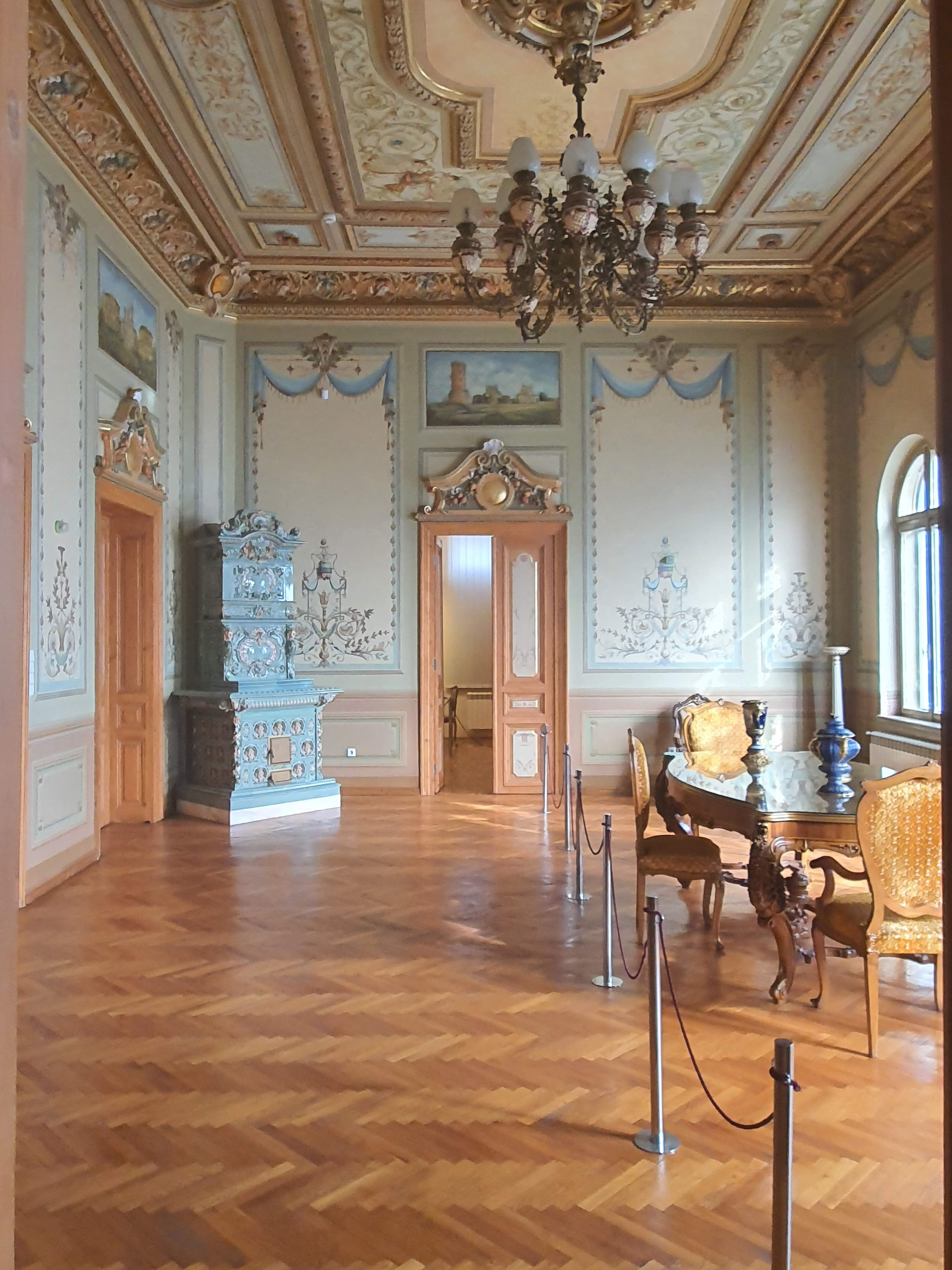
Târgoviște Art Museum Interior design

The building stands as one of the significant architectural landmarks of the city from the late 19th century. Constructed between 1892 and 1894 under the stewardship of Italian entrepreneur Giovanni Baltasare Vignosa, it originally served as the seat of the Dâmbovița County Prefecture. The edifice employs a classical architectural style infused with Baroque influences, complemented by an interior adorned with murals. The artwork becomes increasingly ornate in the successive levels, culminating in the highly decorated "Sălii de Consiliu" (Council Room). The mural paintings adorning this central room exhibit motifs inspired by Neoclassicism, botanical elements, and floral designs, strongly influenced by Italian Baroque aesthetics. Above each of the five entrances to the room, there are painted landscapes featuring landmarks of Târgoviște, such as the Domnească Court and the New Metropolis, as envisioned by the Italian painter Giovanni Battista del Basso in 1894–1895. A unique depiction of the Dâmbovița County crest tops the central doorway. In the 1970s, following the relocation of the County Prefecture to a larger and more modern facility, the building served as the Adult Section of the County Library until the late 1980s. Subsequently, it underwent extensive renovations to combat advanced deterioration, culminating in its reopening to the public in 2009 as an art museum.

The museum building has been designated a historical monument with the code DB-II-m-B-17238.

== Collection ==
The exhibition at the Târgoviște Art Museum displays the heritage of Romanian art.

On the ground floor, there is a selection of Romanian ancient art, predominantly characterized by religious paintings executed in various media. This includes frescoes from the Brâncovenesc period, as well as icons dating back to the 18th century and beyond, some even from the early 19th century. The collection deviates from traditional religious artwork with the inclusion of small-scale neoclassical icons created by Gheorghe Tattarescu in the latter half of the 19th century (circa 1863–1864), marking a transition from religious to easel painting, prominently displayed on the upper floor.

An example of this transition is found in the interiors illustrated by Gheorghe Tattarescu, with anonymous portraits of nobles. These portraits are characterized by schematically depicted costumes and expressive faces, evoking the tradition of votive paintings created by various church patrons.

There are artworks created towards the end of the 19th century by artists such as Nicolae Grigorescu, Sava Henția, George Demetrescu Mirea, and Ștefan Vasilescu, marking the evolving artistic styles and changes taking place across the country. The early 20th century is represented by the early works influenced by Grigorescu's style, courtesy of Gheorghe Petrașcu, as well as academic portraits by painter Ștefan Vasilescu.

Beginning in the 1920s, the exhibition showcases an important period of Romanian art: works by Nicolae Tonitza depict children, portraits of high society ladies are presented in various styles by artists such as Cecilia Cuțescu-Storck, Costin Petrescu, Theodor Pallady, or possibly Eustațiu Stoenescu. The exhibition culminates with the luminosity offered by the landscapes of Nicolae Dărăscu in Balcic before the onset of the Second World War.

Throughout the museum, a variety of artistic techniques are displayed, from traditional to more modern, including tempera on wood, frescoes, pastels, and oil on various media. Each artist's distinctive colors, such as the blues and whites of Gheorghe Petrașcu, the warm grays of Theodor Pallady, the bright yellows of Nicolae Tonitza, the gray tones of Nicolae Grigorescu, the blues of Nicolae Dărăscu, and the greens of Bob Bulgaru, are present in the artworks of the permanent exhibition.
