= Chindia Târgoviște =

Chindia Târgoviște may refer to:

- FCM Târgoviște, a Romanian football club founded in 1948 that was named Chindia Târgoviște between 1996 and 2003
- AFC Chindia Târgoviște, a Romanian football club founded in 2010
- Chindia Tower, a tower in Târgoviște, Romania
