= Târgoviște =

- Municipality
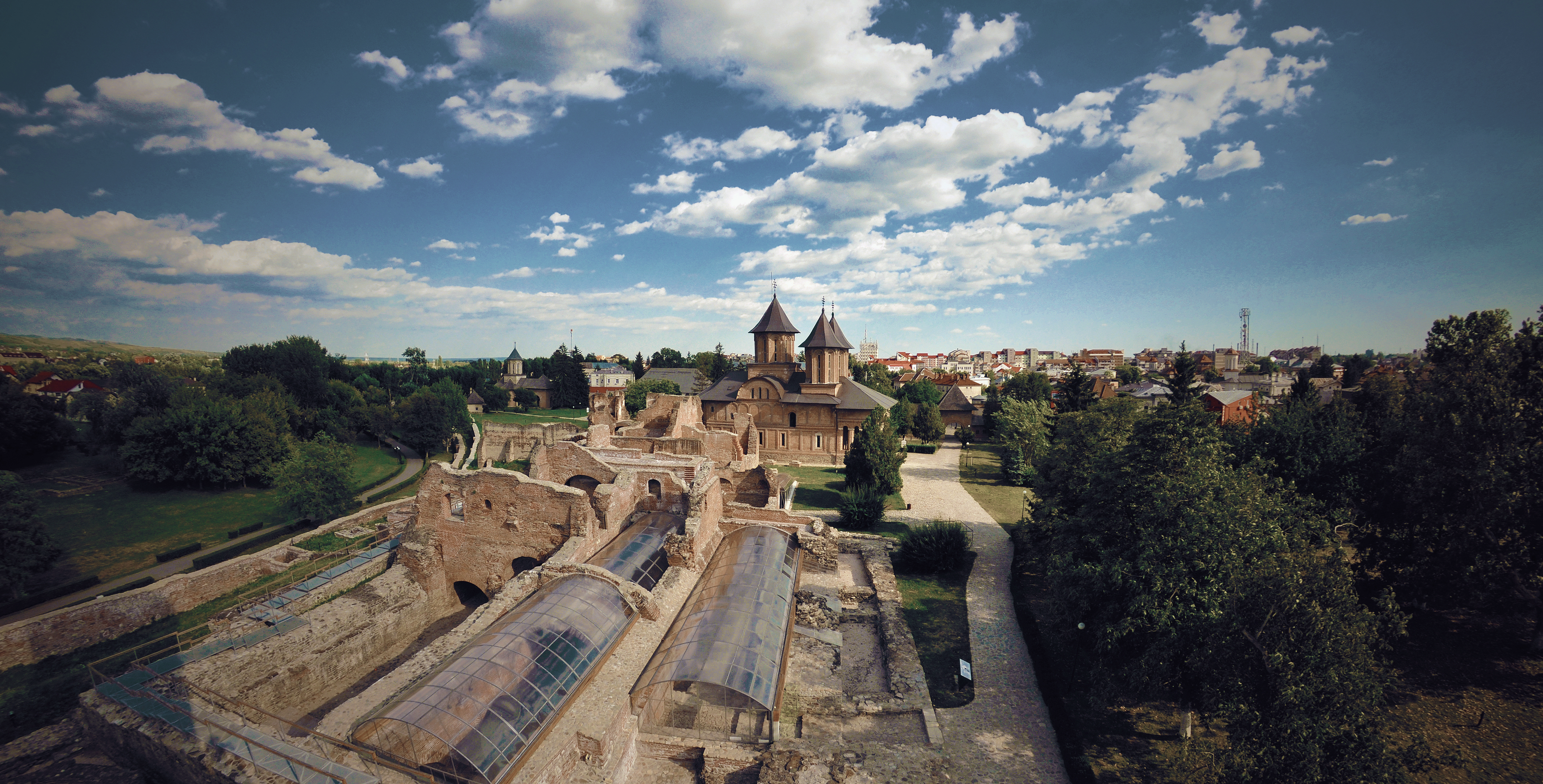
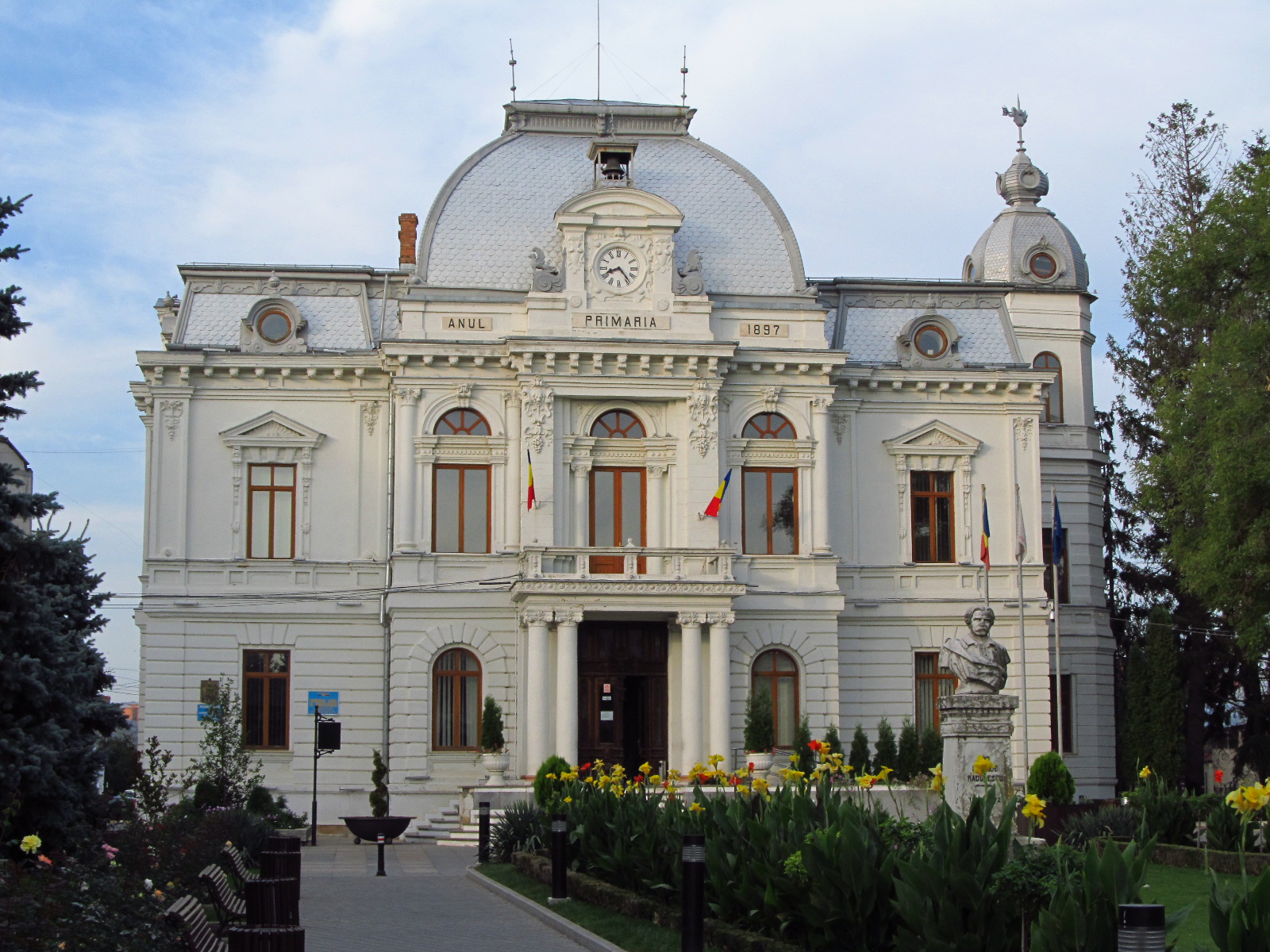
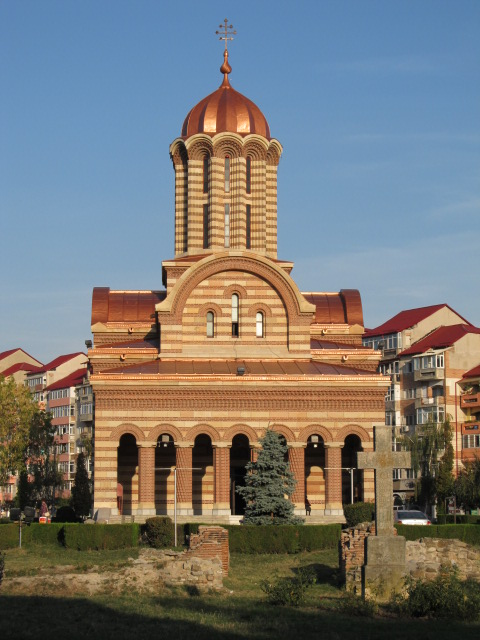
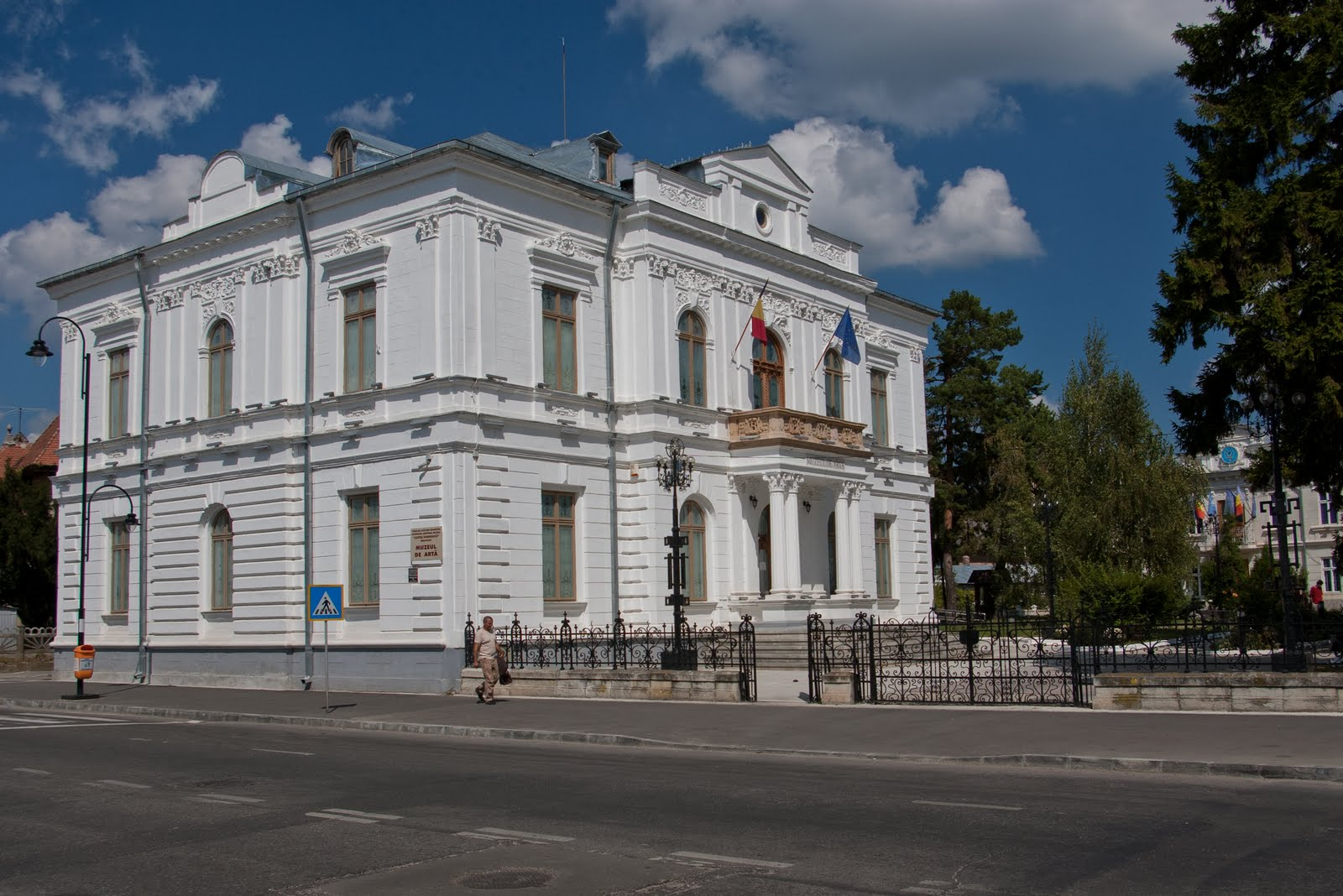
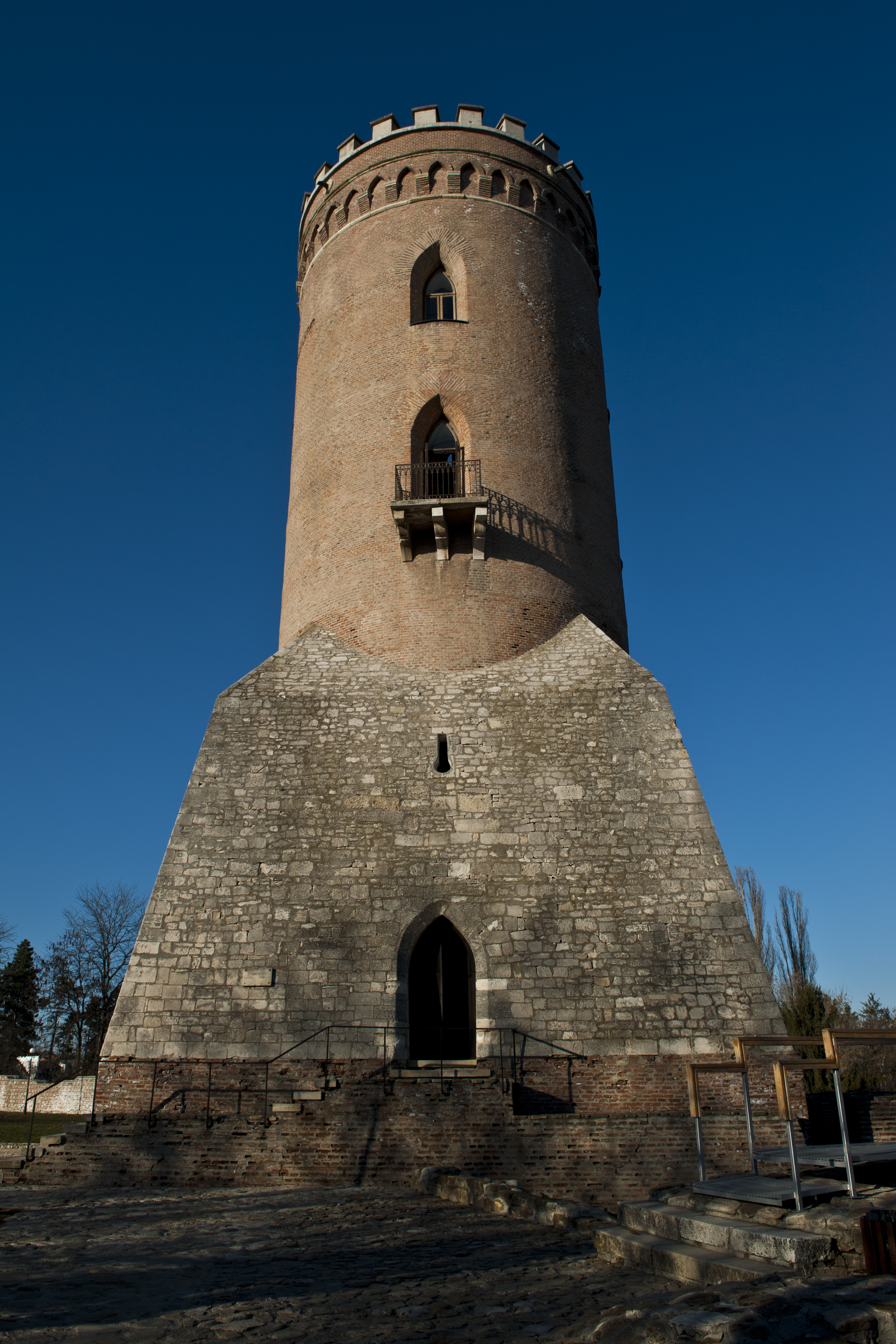
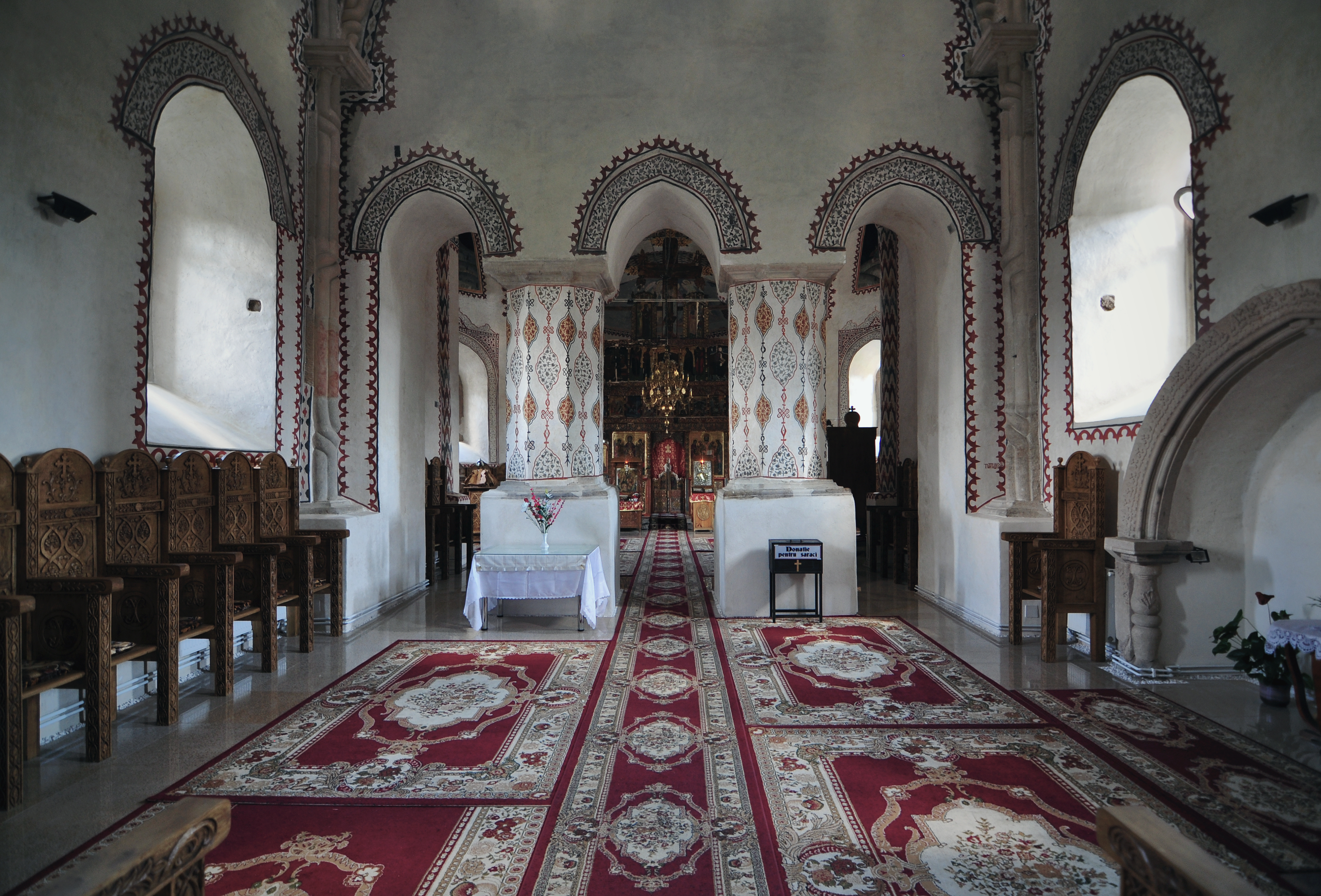
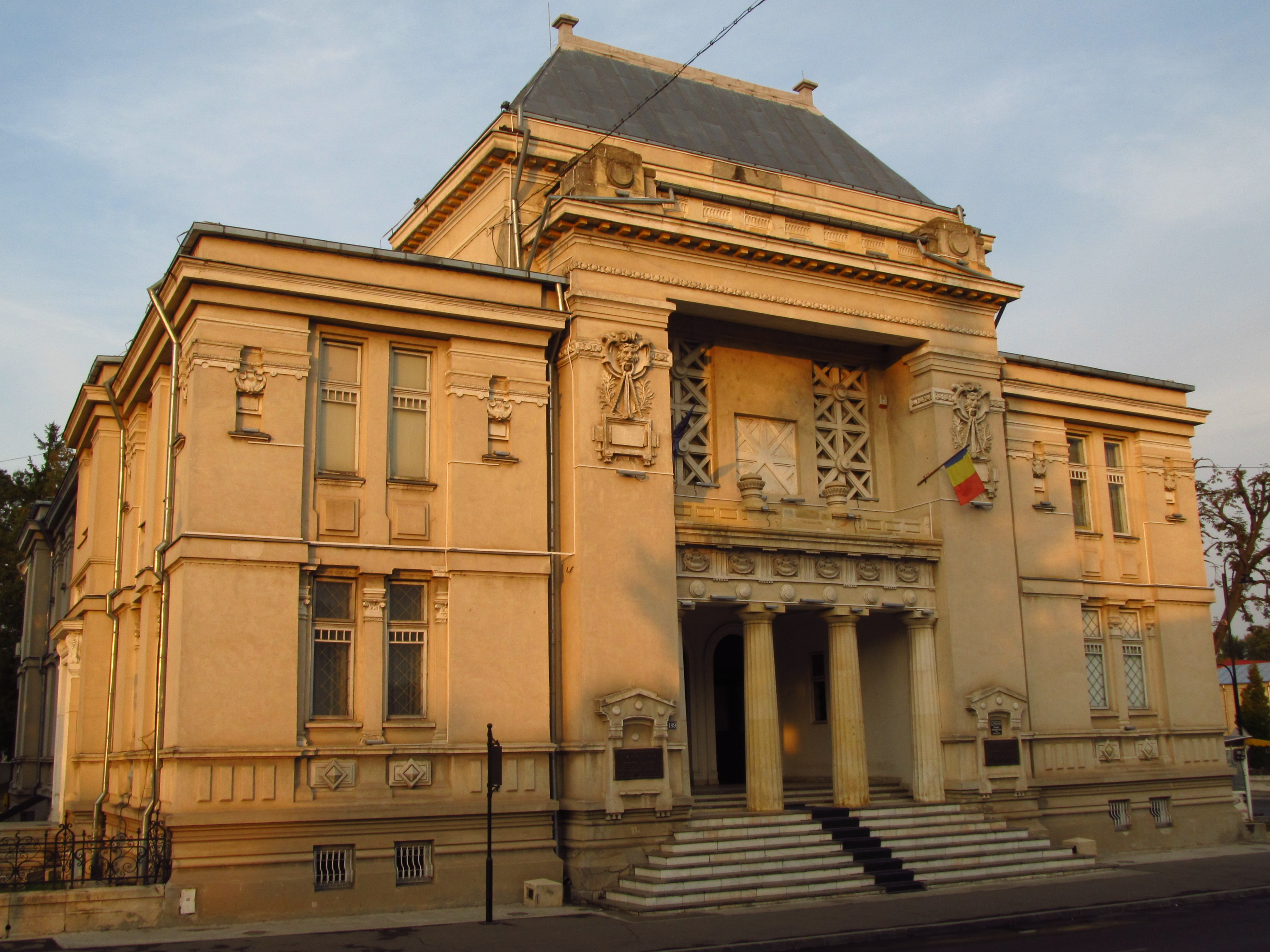
- Left to right, top to bottom: Târgoviște Princely Court, City Hall, Ascension Metropolitan Church, Art Museum, Chindia Tower, Stelea Monastery, History Museum

- Coat of arms

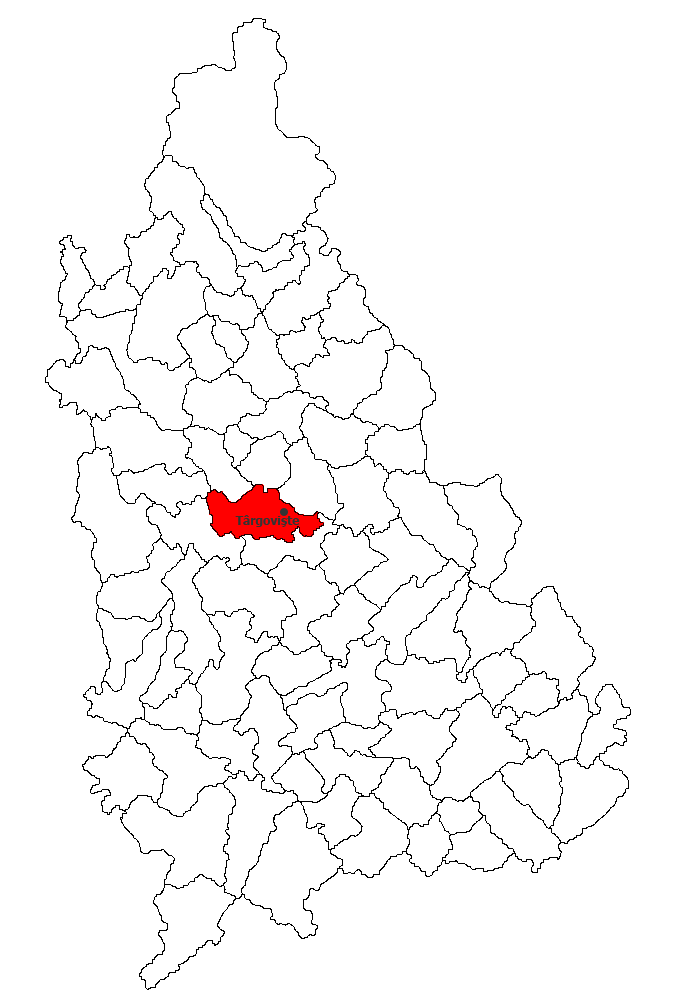
- Location in Dâmbovița County

- Location in Romania
- Coordinates: 44°55′28″N 25°27′26″E
- Country: Romania
- County: Dâmbovița

Government
  - Mayor (2024–2028): Cristian Stan (PSD)
- Area: 50.4 km^{2} (19.5 sq mi)
- Elevation: 292 m (958 ft)
- Population (2021-12-01): 66,965
  - Density: 1,330/km^{2} (3,440/sq mi)
- Time zone: UTC+02:00 (EET)
  - Summer (DST): UTC+03:00 (EEST)
- Postal code: 130002–130169
- Area code: (+40) 02 45
- Vehicle reg.: DB
- Website: www.pmtgv.ro

Târgoviște (Romanian pronunciation: [tɨrˈɡoviʃte], alternatively spelled Tîrgoviște) is a city and county seat in Dâmbovița County, Romania. It is situated 80 kilometres (50 miles) north-west of Bucharest, on the right bank of the Ialomița River.

Târgoviște was one of the most important cities in the history of Wallachia, as it was its capital from 1418 to 1659. At the 2021 census, the city had a population of 66,965 people, making it the 27th largest in the country.

== Etymology ==
The name Târgoviște is a Slavic name which the city acquired in the Middle Ages. It is derived from the old Slavonic word for "marketplace", referring to the place rather than the market itself.

The name is found in placenames not only in South Slavic areas (Bulgarian Търговище, Serbian Трговиште and Croatian Veliko Trgovišće), but also in West Slavic such as Slovak Trhovište, Czech Trhoviště or Polish Targowica. Additionally, places with the same name are found in Romania, in the regions of Oltenia, Banat, and Moldavia.

The Romanian and Bulgarian towns with the same name are also twinned.

== History ==
=== Early history ===
The area of Târgoviște which was first inhabited is located where the Saint Nicholas-Geartoglu Church and Stelea Veche Church stand today. It was in this place that the first fortifications were built: a small stone building surrounded by a brick wall and a moat, probably belonging to a local ruler. However, archaeological evidence is scarce and it is difficult to pinpoint exactly when it was erected.

=== Saxon colony ===
Another nucleus of the city was built by Saxon colonists from Transylvania, in the area where the Catholic Saint Mary Church is located, a church that was built during the early years of the colony. A local tradition says that the church was built in 1300. The colonists came around the end of the 13th century and the beginning of the 14th century, the same period that Câmpulung was colonized. There is archeological evidence that the land occupied by the new colonists had been previously inhabited by locals, which leads to the conclusion that it had been approved by the local ruler.

The colonists influenced the local administration, as Târgoviște was the only town in Wallachia that had Transylvanian organization features, having official titles such as birău and folnog, which are found in documents together with local officials, like vornic and pristav. The town had a night watch which was also known by a Latin term (viglu < vigilia) instead of the local terms such pază or strajă. Under Mircea the Elder (1383–1419), Târgoviște became the third capital of Wallachia.

After 1400, the town began to grow and become denser. In both the Saxon part (around the stronghold) and the Romanian part, there were several large dwellings with cellars and cocklestoves similar to those found in Central Europe. The wealth is also known based on the number of treasure troves discovered, the largest being a hoard of 6,284 silver coins, found in the Saxon part of the town. The town gravitated around the Saxon part, this being valid until the Saxon community began its decline during the 16th century.

=== Capital of Wallachia ===
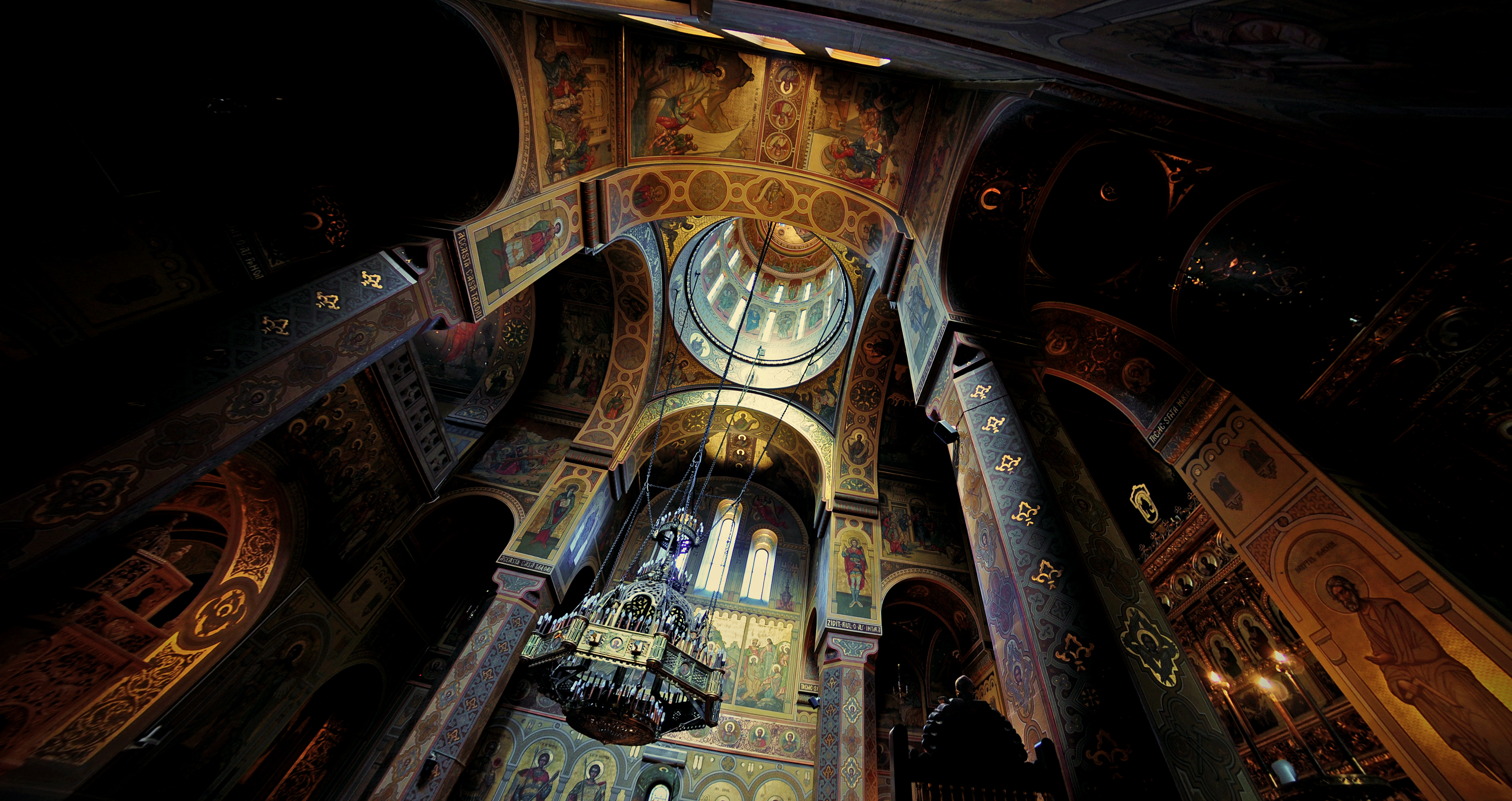
Interior of the Ascension Cathedral

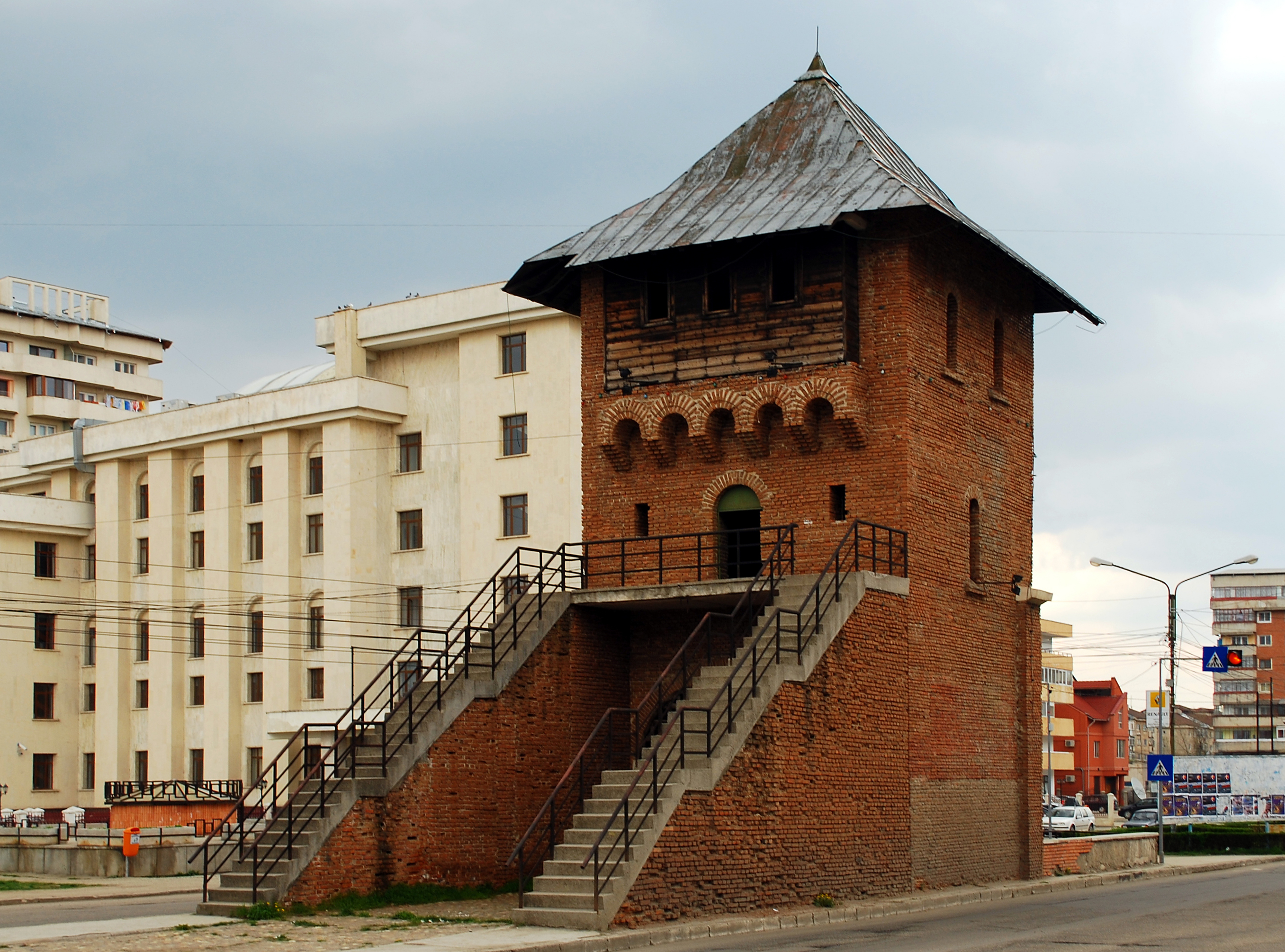
Bucharest Gate

In the 15th century, the capital of Wallachia was Curtea de Argeș, however, due to Târgoviște's economic growth, toward the end of the century, it became a secondary residence of the Wallachian hospodar. In 1396, Bavarian traveler Johann Schiltberger mentions both Curtea de Argeș and Târgoviște as capitals of Wallachia. While Mircea I lived in Curtea de Argeș, Michael I, Mircea's son and co-prince lived in Târgoviște, where he continued to live even as a single ruler. Dan II preferred Curtea de Argeș and he was the last hospodar to rule from that city, the court being finally moved to Târgoviște by Alexandru Aldea in 1431.

Throughout the period it was the capital of Wallachia, the Târgoviște Princely Court (Curtea Domnească din Târgoviște) had been constantly refurbished and extended. The compound was surrounded by stone walls and a moat and a new church and a tower had been built. Vlad III Dracula ("the Impaler") later added the Chindia Tower, now a symbol of the city.

Starting with 1565, for the next two centuries, the rulers alternated the capital between Târgoviște and Bucharest, often on political reasons, as the former was preferred by the rulers who were more friendly toward Transylvania and the King of Hungary. Throughout the 15th and 16th centuries, Târgoviște was a major trade hub, especially with Poland, Brașov, and Sibiu.

By the 16th century, the Romanians became majority in the city, as some Saxons left for Transylvania and others were assimilated. Greek merchants began to settle in the city, especially after 1500, while Greek monks settled in the nearby Dealu and Panaghia monasteries.

As the capital of Wallachia, Târgoviște faced numerous sieges and invasions. In 1395, it was sieged and set on fire by Bayezid I. In 1457, the townsfolk of Târgoviște were punished by Vlad III Dracula for their involvement in the assassination of his brother: the elite of the city were killed, while the young were sent to work at his Poenari Castle.

The Ottoman invasion of 1462 did not reach the city, being prevented by Vlad III through the night attack at Târgoviște. In 1476, the city was taken by Stephen V Báthory following a fifteen-day siege intended to restore Vlad to the throne. Several other battles were fought near the city during the rules of Neagoe Basarab and Radu of Afumați.

In 1597, the Hajduks of Mihai Viteazul and Starina Novak fought and won a decisive battle against the Ottoman Empire in Târgoviște.

=== Decline ===
After the capital was finally moved to Bucharest during the rule of Constantin Brâncoveanu (1688–1714), Târgoviște lost its importance, decaying economically as its population decreased.

=== Modern history ===
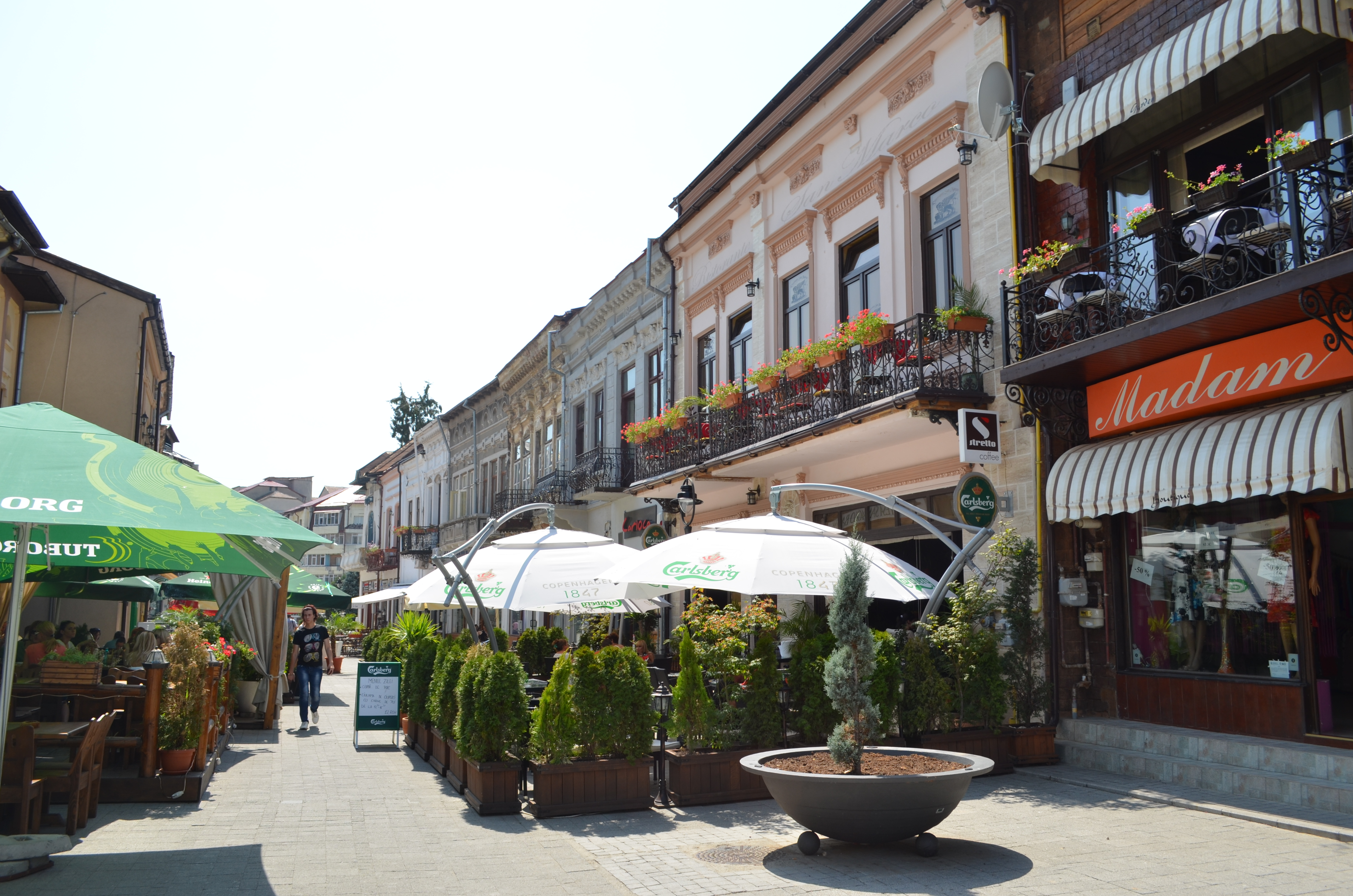
Alexandru Ioan Cuza Street

Târgoviște was the site of the torture and execution of Tudor Vladimirescu on 7 June 1821 during the Wallachian uprising.

Târgoviște was the site of the trial and execution of Nicolae Ceaușescu and his wife Elena on 25 December 1989 during the Romanian Revolution. In 2025, the military unit where the execution was held opened to the public as the Museum of Military Tradition.

== Geography ==
One village, Priseaca, is administered by the city.

== Population ==
In 2021, there were 66,965 inhabitants. According to the 2002 census, 96.6% of the inhabitants were Romanians and 2.84% Roma people.

Historical population
Year	Pop.	±%
1900	9,400	—
1912	13,041	+38.7%
1930	22,298	+71.0%
1948	26,038	+16.8%
1956	24,360	−6.4%
1966	29,763	+22.2%
1977	61,254	+105.8%
1992	98,117	+60.2%
2002	89,930	−8.3%
2011	79,610	−11.5%
2021	66,965	−15.9%
Source: Census data

== Transportation ==
=== Railway ===
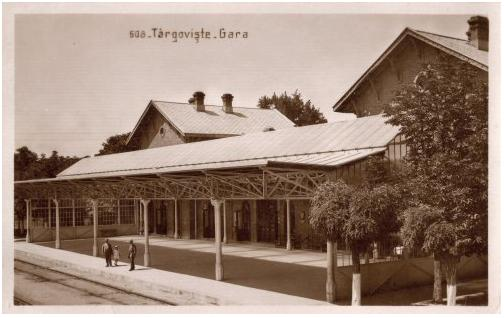
Târgoviște rail station in 1930. The building was inaugurated in 1884.

Târgoviște is a railway node, with branches serving Titu (joining there the Ploiești and Pietroșița lines).The railway station building was inaugurated on 2 January 1884, served by the then new line from Titu to Târgoviște. This first line was built by the VIIth Rail Company of the Ist Engineering Regiment of the Romanian Army. On 27 May 1894, an extension of this line to Pucioasa was inaugurated. The Ploiești–Târgoviște branch construction was started in 1929, but officially inaugurated only on 29 June 1946.

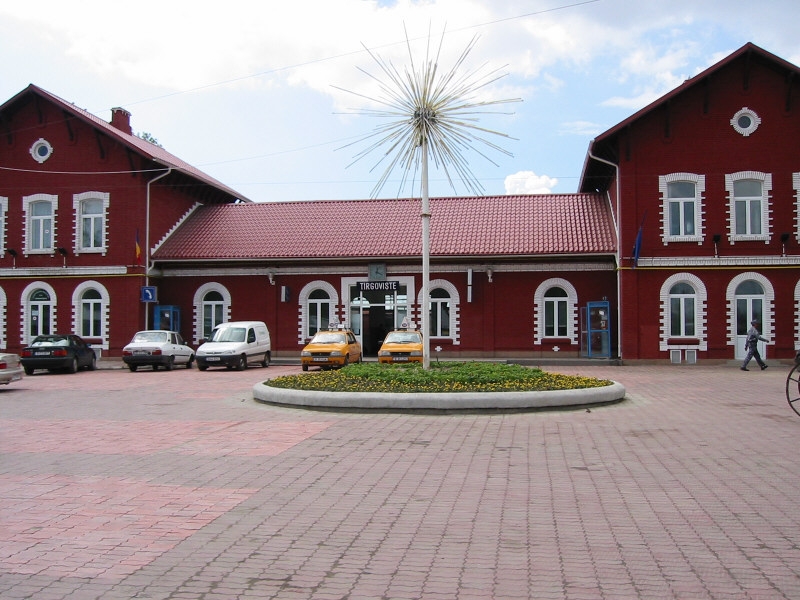
The building of railway station was renovated in 2000–2004.

Today, the city is served by multiple stations:

- Târgoviște (south-west of the town).
- Romlux halt (north-west).
- Teiș halt (former Târgoviște-Vest) (north).
- Târgoviște Nord station (north-east).
- Valea Voievozilor halt (east).

The railway station is open for both passenger traffic - with sales/reservation office and electronic ticketing machine - and merchandise traffic. Local halts serves the large industrial operators of the city - Mechel, Oțelinox, Upet, Erdemir, Romlux, Rondocarton.

=== Roads ===
Located at a crossroads of ancient trade routes, the city can be easily approached from all sides. Târgoviște Municipality is located approximatively 80 kilometres (50 miles) north-west of Bucharest, with a convenient access to Henri Coandă International Airport, located in Otopeni, to the north of Bucharest.

Road number	Cities
DN 71	Tărtășești — Târgoviște — Pucioasa — Sinaia
DN 72	Găești — Târgoviște — Ploiești
DN 72A	Târgoviște — Câmpulung

Also, a number of county roads pass the city:

- DJ 711 Târgoviște — Bujoreanca
- DJ 712 Târgoviște — Șotânga — Vulcana-Pandele — Brănești — Pucioasa
- DJ 718A Târgoviște — Dealu Monastery
- DJ 719 Târgoviște — Valea Voievozilor
- DJ 721 Târgoviște — Colanu — Văcărești — Perșinari — Gura Șuții — Produlești —Costești Deal

=== Public transport ===
In the city, public transport is provided by Public Transport and include bus and maxi-taxi. From 1995 until 2005, trolleybuses operated in the city. In 2005 public transport was developed and modernized, Public Transport becoming a passenger transport company in public-private partnership.

== Twin towns – sister cities ==
Târgoviște is twinned with:

- Castellón de la Plana, Spain
- Căușeni, Moldova
- Corbetta, Italy
- Ciudad Real, Spain
- Gioia del Colle, Italy
- Guilin, China
- Karadeniz Ereğli, Turkey
- Kazanlak, Bulgaria
- Nefteyugansk, Russia
- Santarém, Portugal
- Targovishte, Bulgaria
- 2nd district of Budapest, Hungary

== Sport ==
The city has one football club, FC Chindia Târgoviște which plays in the second tier of Romanian football, the Liga II.

Târgovişte is also home to Municipal MCM Târgovişte basketball club which competes in the Romanian League and the EuroCup.

The city also hosts a distinct underground culture and action sports scene. The prominent local urban sports community is The Grind Vice (T.G.V.), which emerged as a successor to the pioneer RGK group. Gathering primarily at the Tricolorului Square (locally known as "Sindicate"), the collective brings together local skateboarders, aggressive bladers, and graffiti artists. The group organizes the *Târgoviște Underground Manifest* (T.U.M.) festival and produces independent skate videos, including the short film *Sindicate 3*, which premiered at the local Cinema Independența in 2025.

== Notable people ==
- Grigore Alexandrescu (1810–1885), poet
- Vasile Atanasiu (1886–1964), general
- Tony Bulandra (1881–1943), actor
- Ioan Alexandru Brătescu-Voinești (1868–1946), writer
- Sorana Cîrstea (born 1990), tennis player
- Cornel Dinu (born 1948), football player
- Florin Pripu (born 1980), professional football player
- Ion Heliade Rădulescu (1802–1872), writer, philologist, politician
- Laurențiu Ion (born 1991), poet
- Theodor Stolojan (born 1943), economist, politician
- Matei Vlădescu (1835–1901), general and politician
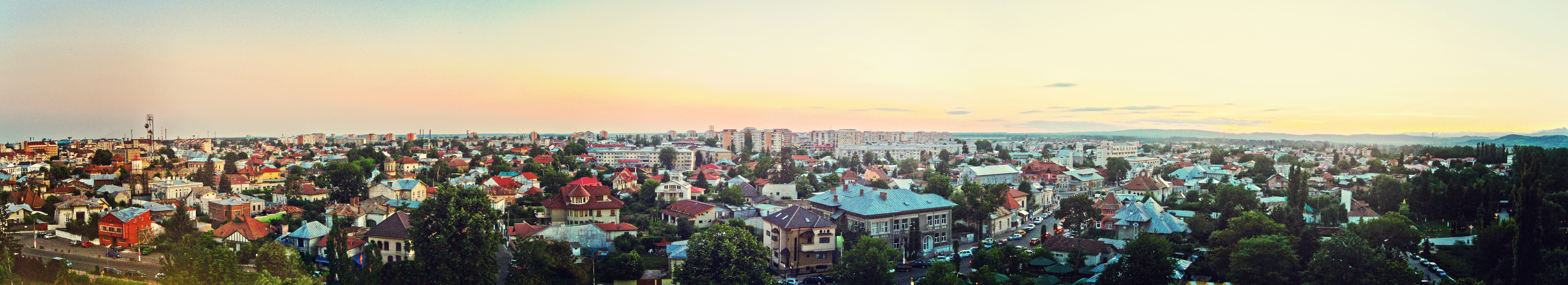
Panorama of Târgoviște as seen from Chindia Tower

== Gallery ==
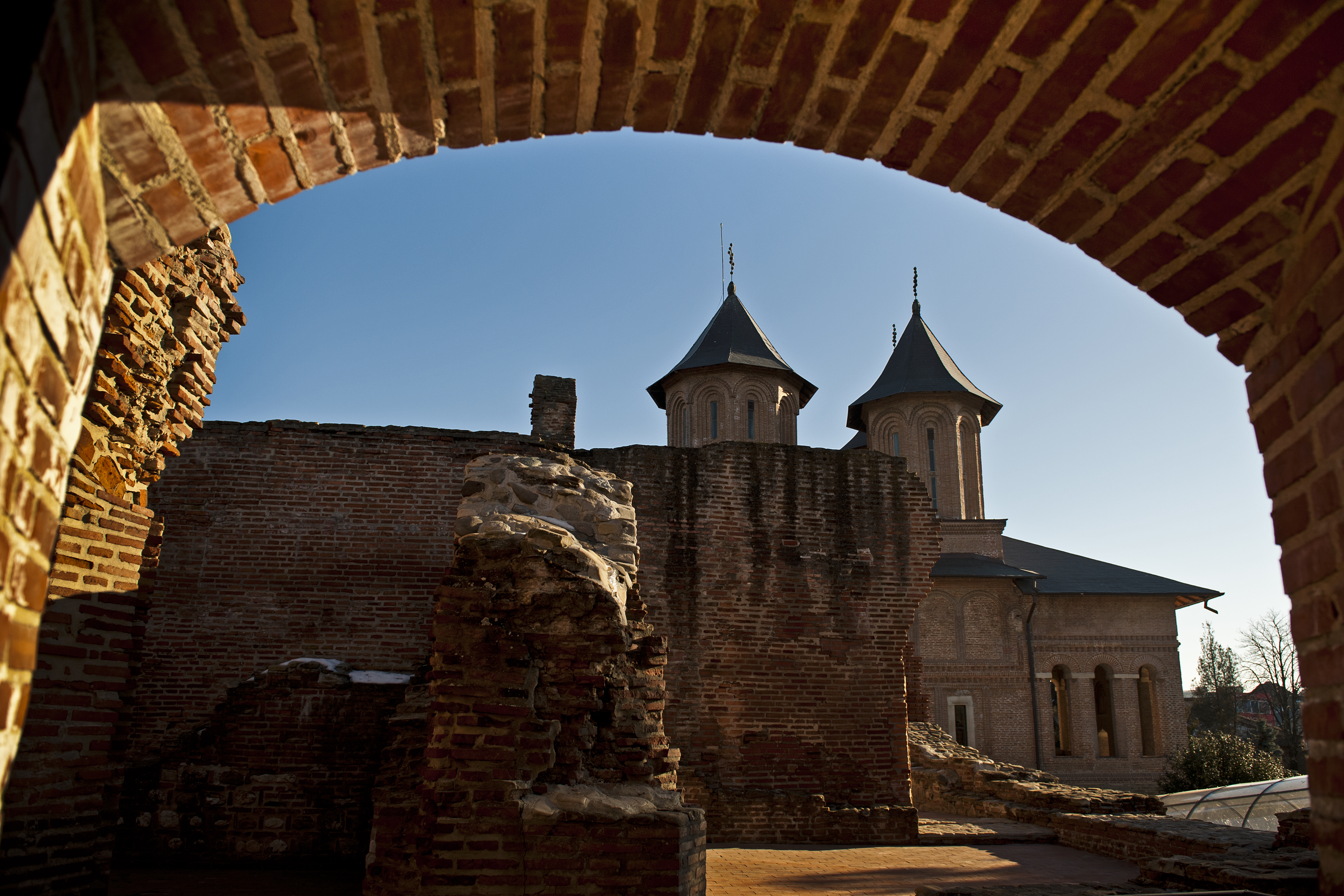
Princely Church

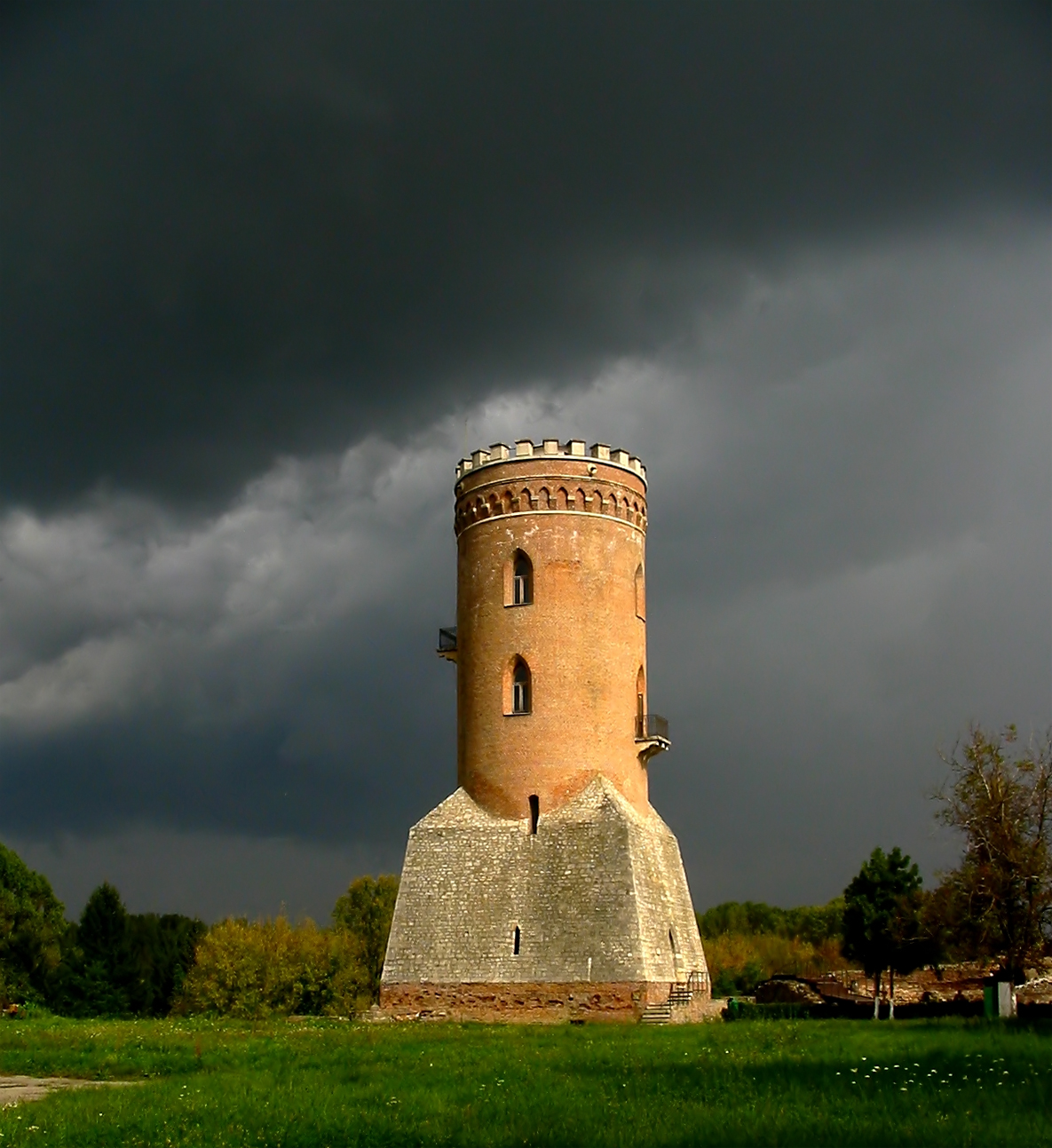
Chindia Tower

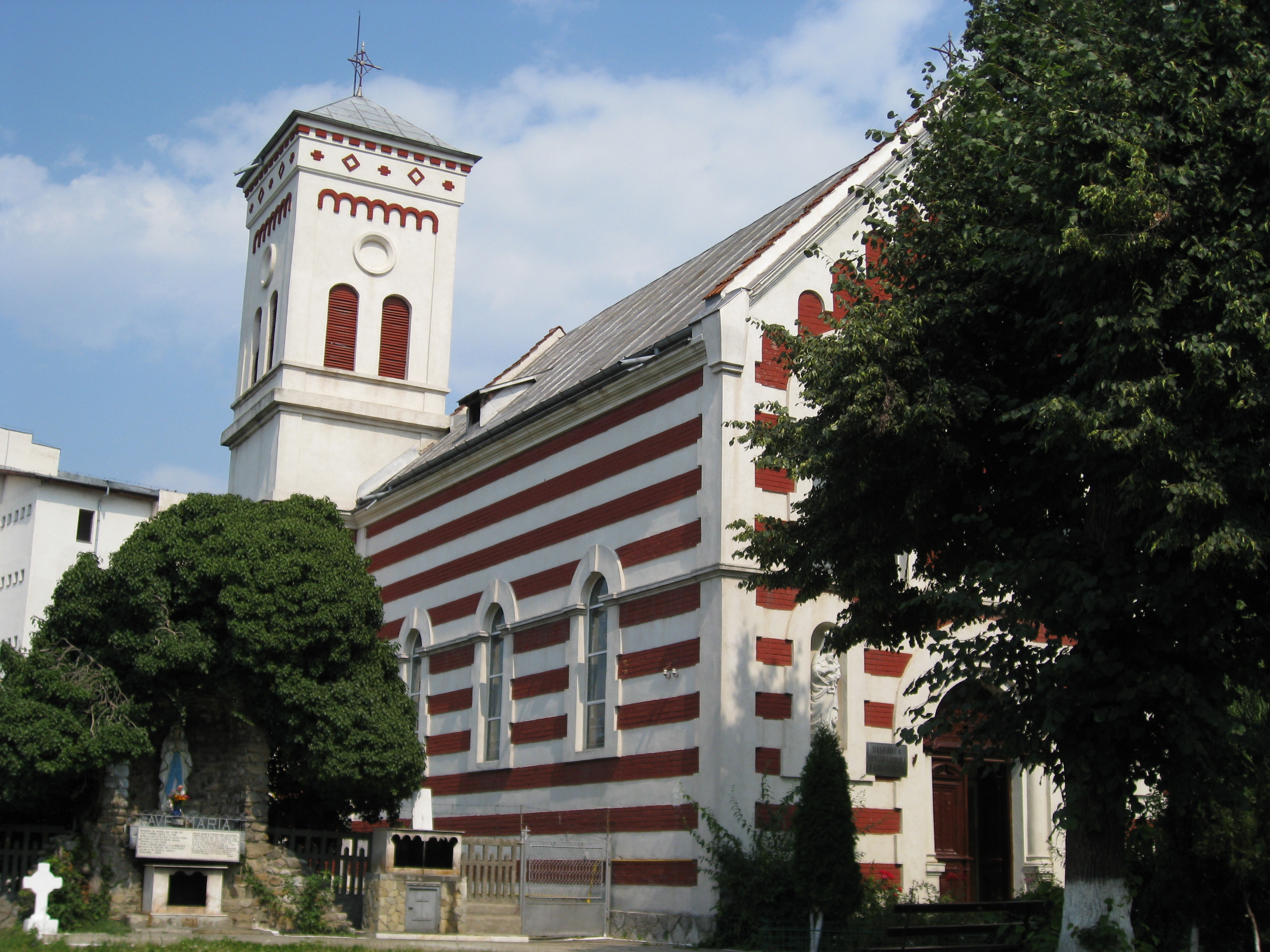
Roman Catholic Church

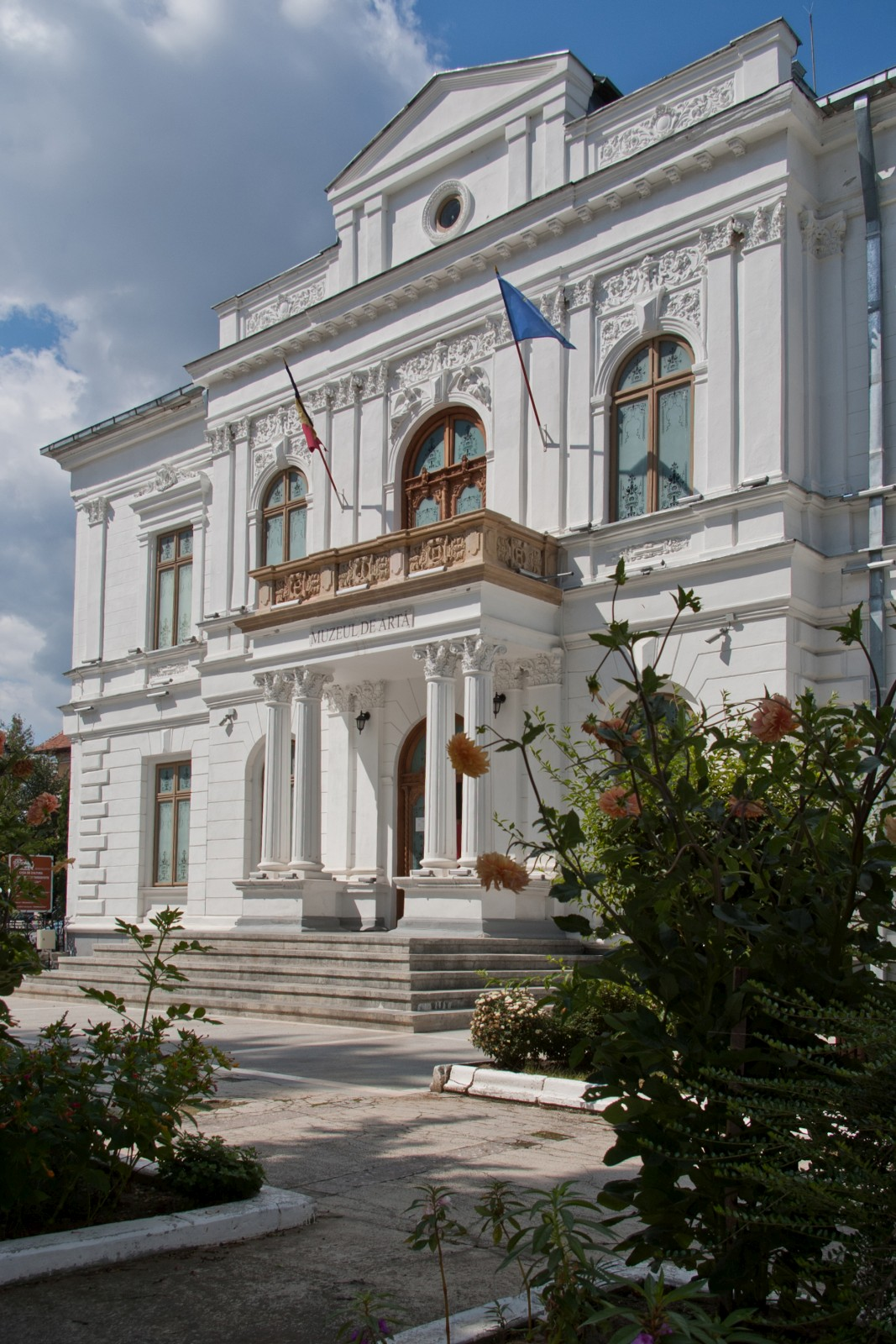
Art Museum (former County Prefecture)

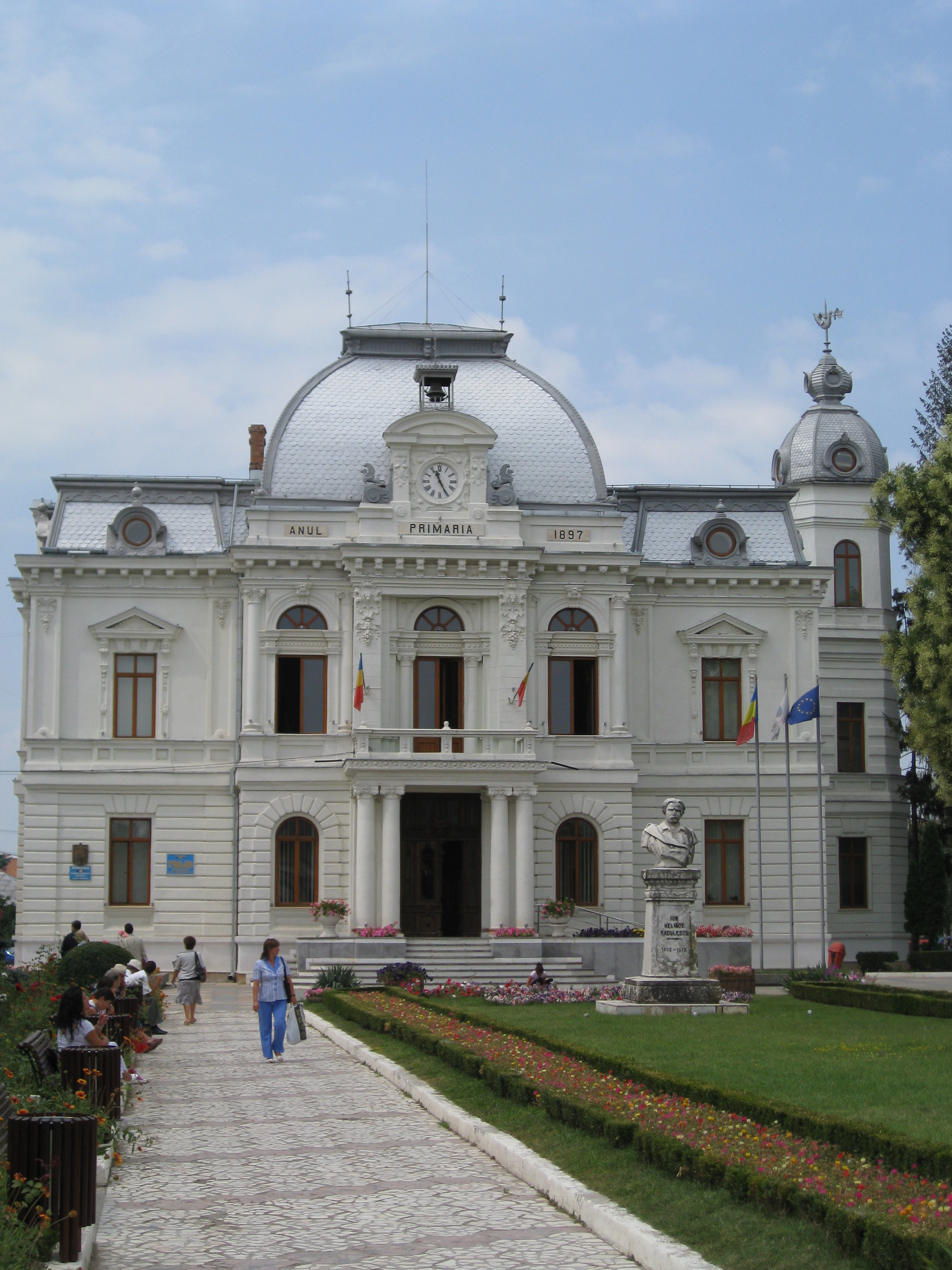
City Hall

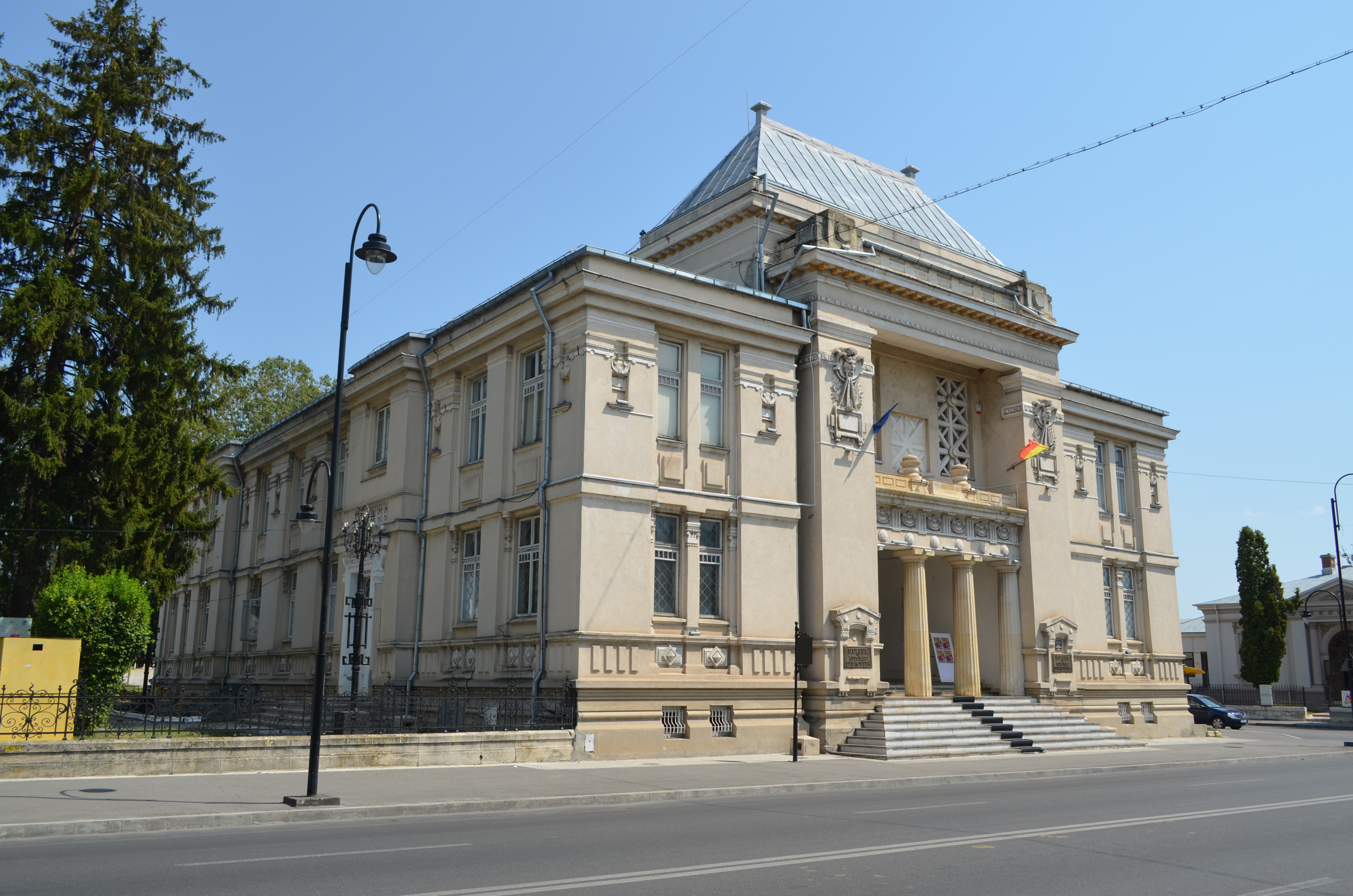
History Museum
