= Chindia Tower =

Tower in Târgoviște, Romania

Coordinates: 44°55′56.77″N 25°27′29.43″E

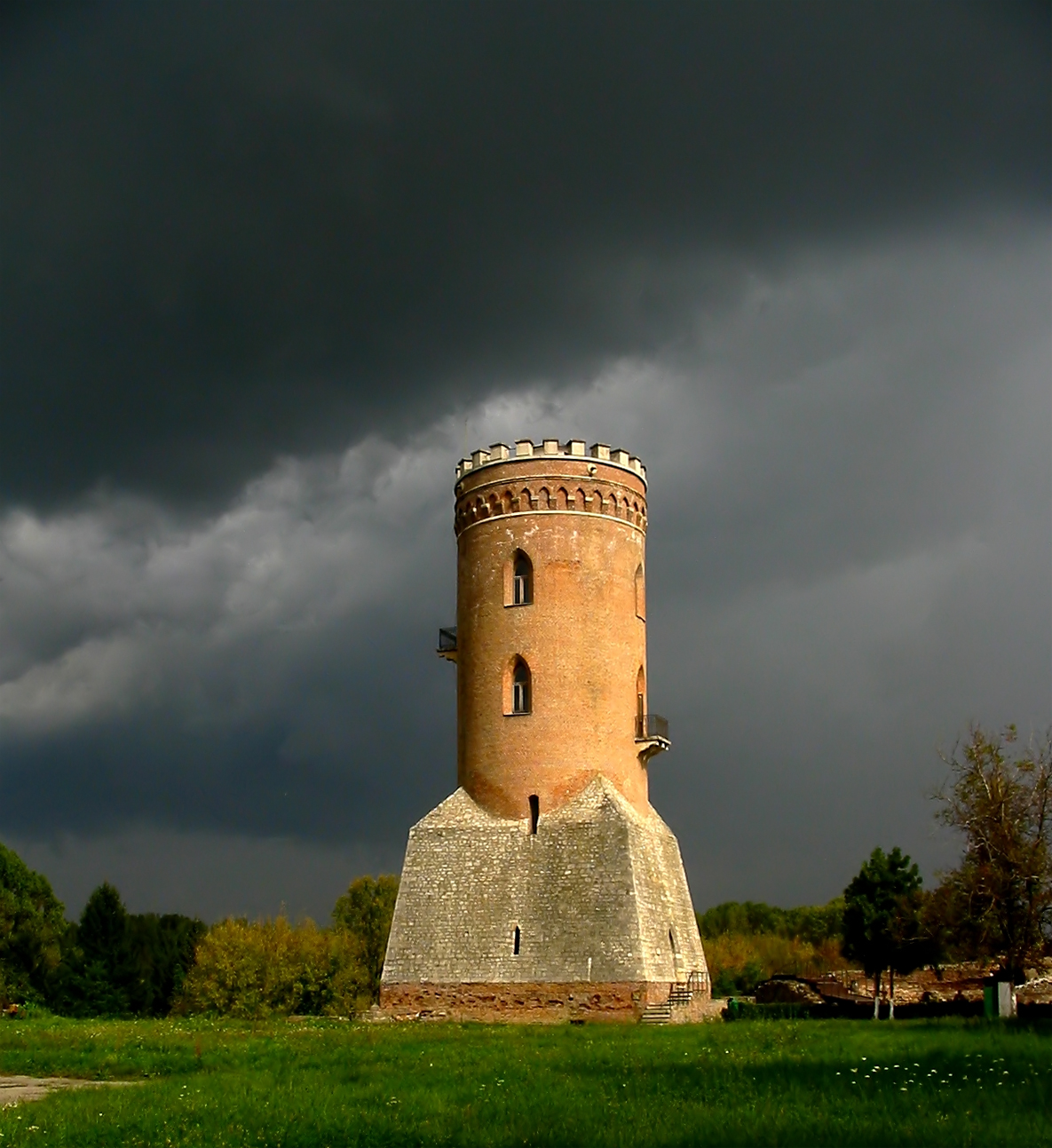
- Interactive map of the Chindia Tower area

General information
- Location: Târgoviște, Romania
- Construction started: 15th century
- Completed: 19th century
- Client: Vlad III the Impaler

Technical details
- Size: height of 27 metres (89 ft), diameter of 9 metres (30 ft)

The Chindia Tower (Romanian: Turnul Chindiei) is a tower in the Curtea Domnească monuments ensemble in Târgoviște, Romania, built in the 15th century. The tower was begun during the second reign of Prince Vlad III the Impaler over Wallachia and took its final form during the 19th century. It initially had a military purpose, but during its history, it has been used as a guard point, a fire spotter, and for storing and protecting the state treasury. Between 1847 and 1851, the Chindia Tower was completely restored by Gheorghe Bibescu who added 5 metres (16 ft) to its height. The building in its current form has a height of 27 metres (89 ft) and a diameter of 9 metres (30 ft).

The Chindia Tower, the most important tourist attraction in Târgoviște, is considered the city's symbol; the tower elements are present in the city's emblem, at the top and also at the bottom. As a monument the tower now houses an exhibition of documents, weapons and objects which belonged to Vlad the Impaler. Today the tower is administered by the National Museum Curtea Domnească.

== Name ==
There are two contrasting hypotheses on the origin of the name of the tower, neither of them fully recognized. The first argues that the area adjacent to the tower was the site of many large feasts and festivals, known in Romanian as chindia. It has also been suggested that the name originates from the word chindia, an archaism which means "sunset", the period of the day in which the guard had an obligation to give the curfew signal, before closing the city's five gates. After this time, he was prohibited from entering or leaving the city throughout the night, and residents were required not to pass through the streets and not to maintain outdoor fires that would have made the town visible from a distance.

== History ==
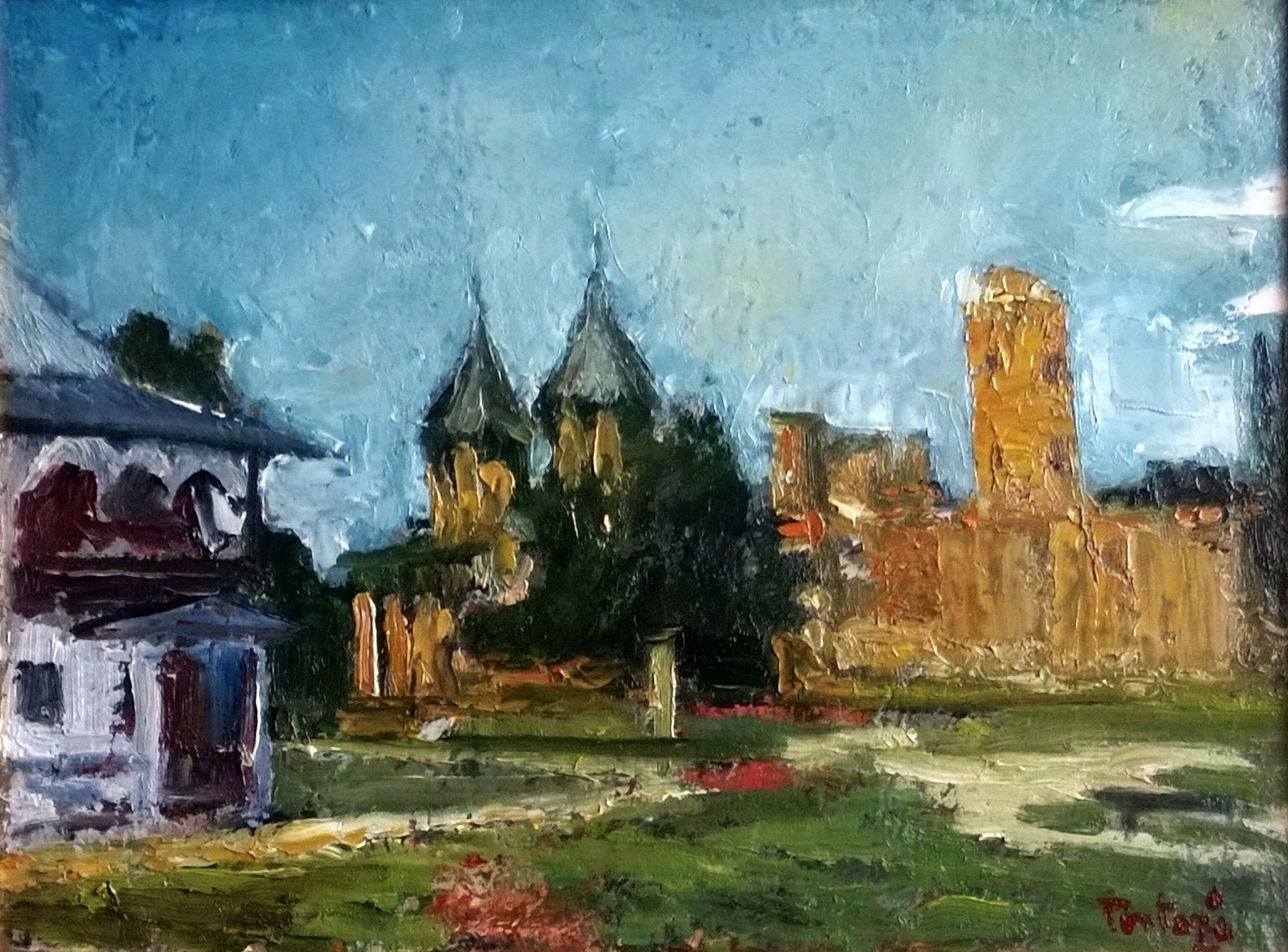
The Fortress of Târgoviște, painting by Valeriu Pantazi

It is not known exactly when the Curtea Domnească complex was built, but it certainly replaces an old manor house still in place by the 15th century during the reign of Mircea I of Wallachia. Nevertheless, the first documentary mentions of the Curtea Domnească date from 1403 and 1409. It is therefore believed that the construction works started during the first reign of Vlad the Impaler, but that the complex remained unfinished. Archaeological excavations conducted in the mid-20th century have revealed that the Chindia Tower dates from the second half of the 15th century leading historians to propose that it is the "castle" referred to in the November 11, 1476, account of Hungarian nobleman Stephen V Báthory. However, the tower is explicitly mentioned in documents at a relatively late moment. In 1595 Venetian traveler Antonio Pigafetta recorded the existence of a "tower in a church", which had an underground gallery in the direction of the Ialomiţa River. In 1703 Rev. Edmund Chishull, chaplain to Lord Paget's English embassy at İzmir, said after visiting the place that the building was comparable to towers of "civilized Christianity".

The tower was also noted by the Bulgarian Catholic bishop Petar Bogdan and foreign travelers such as Paul of Aleppo. The latter stated that "the court is in a high tower that serves as a lamp for the city clock", housing a fanfare which entertained the princes with Oriental music. Towards the middle of the 18th century, a Latin manuscript from the Batthyaneum Library states that the tower was used as a prison. In 1840 the French draughtsman Michel Bouquet provided a rendition of how the tower looked before its restoration.

== Photos ==
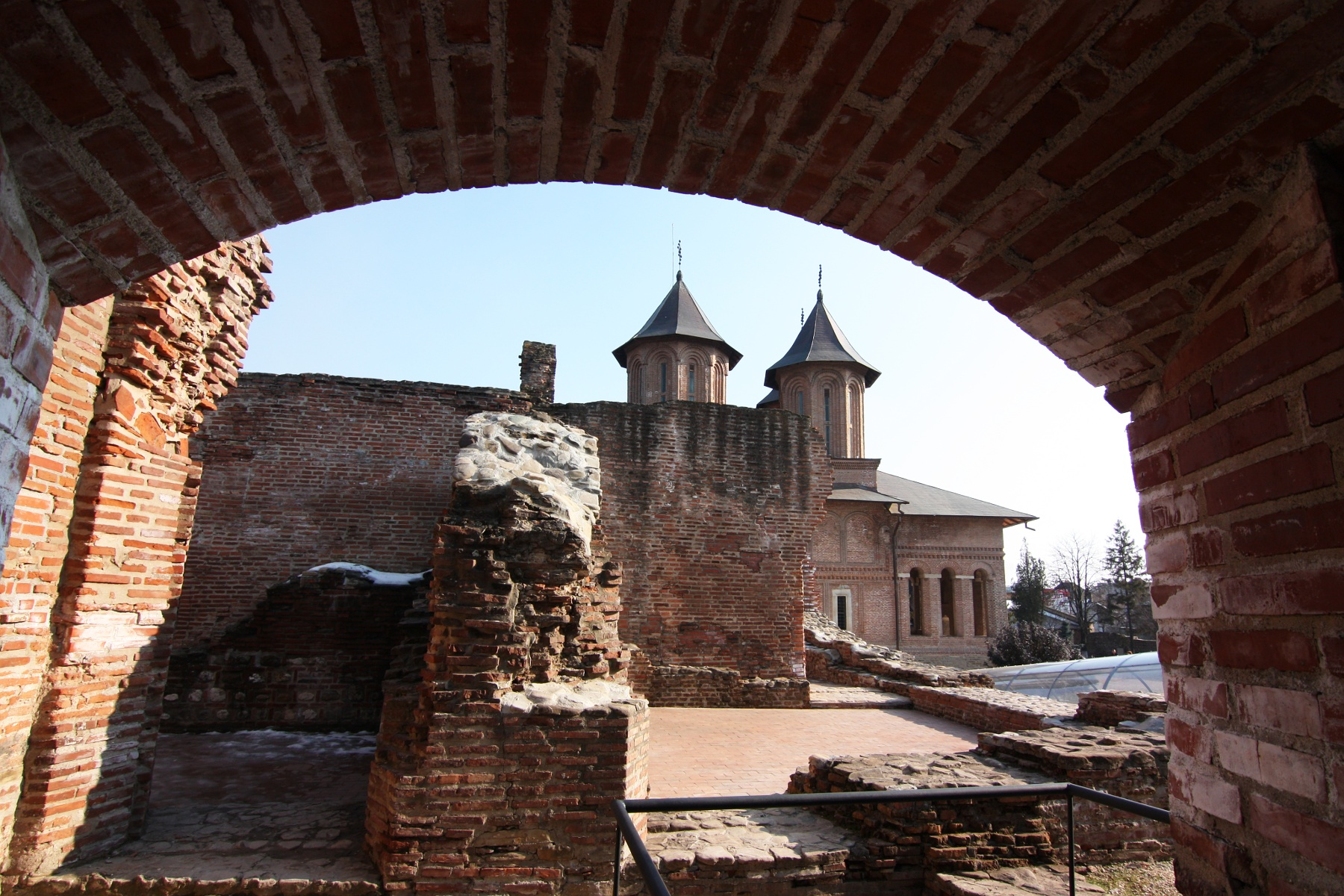

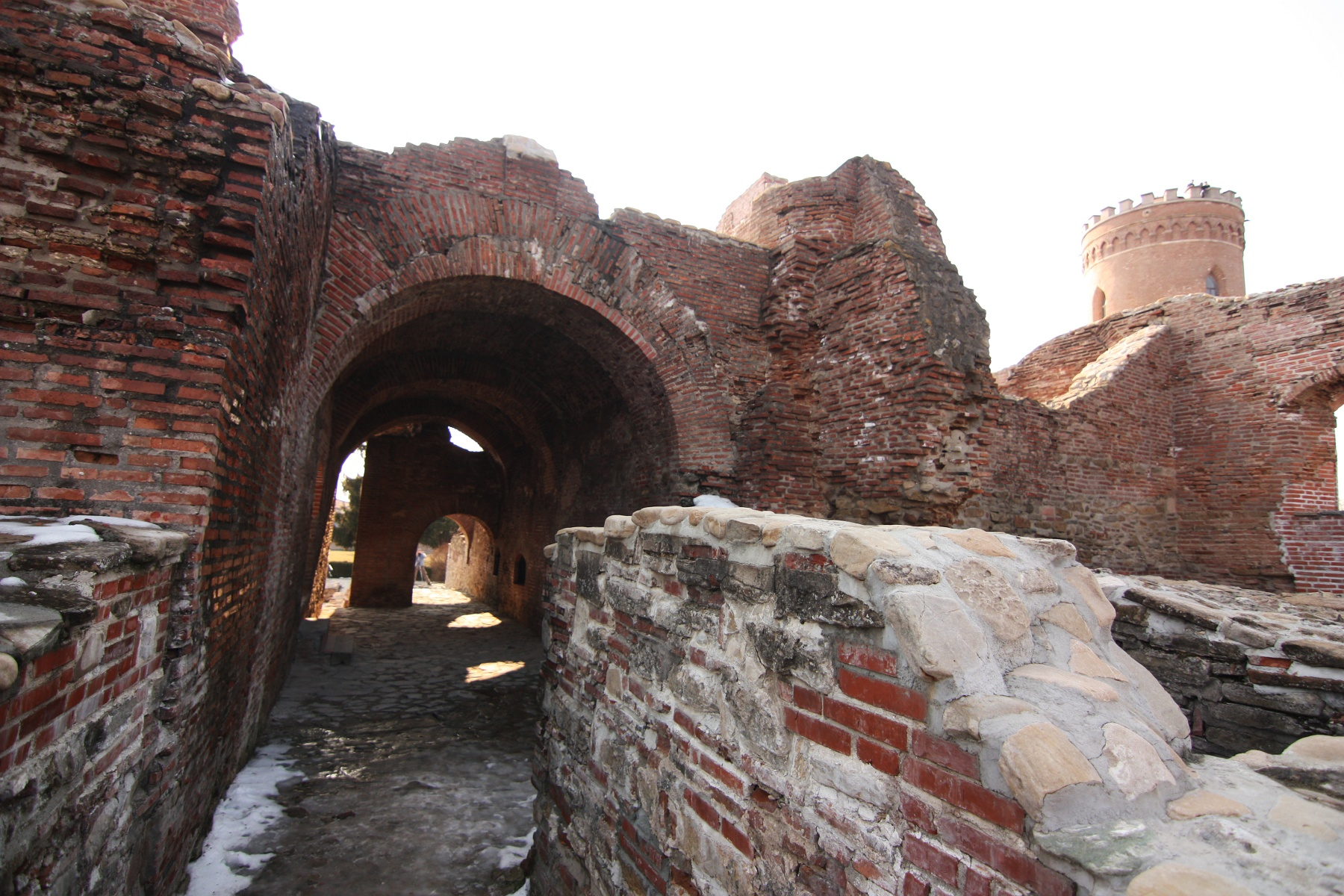

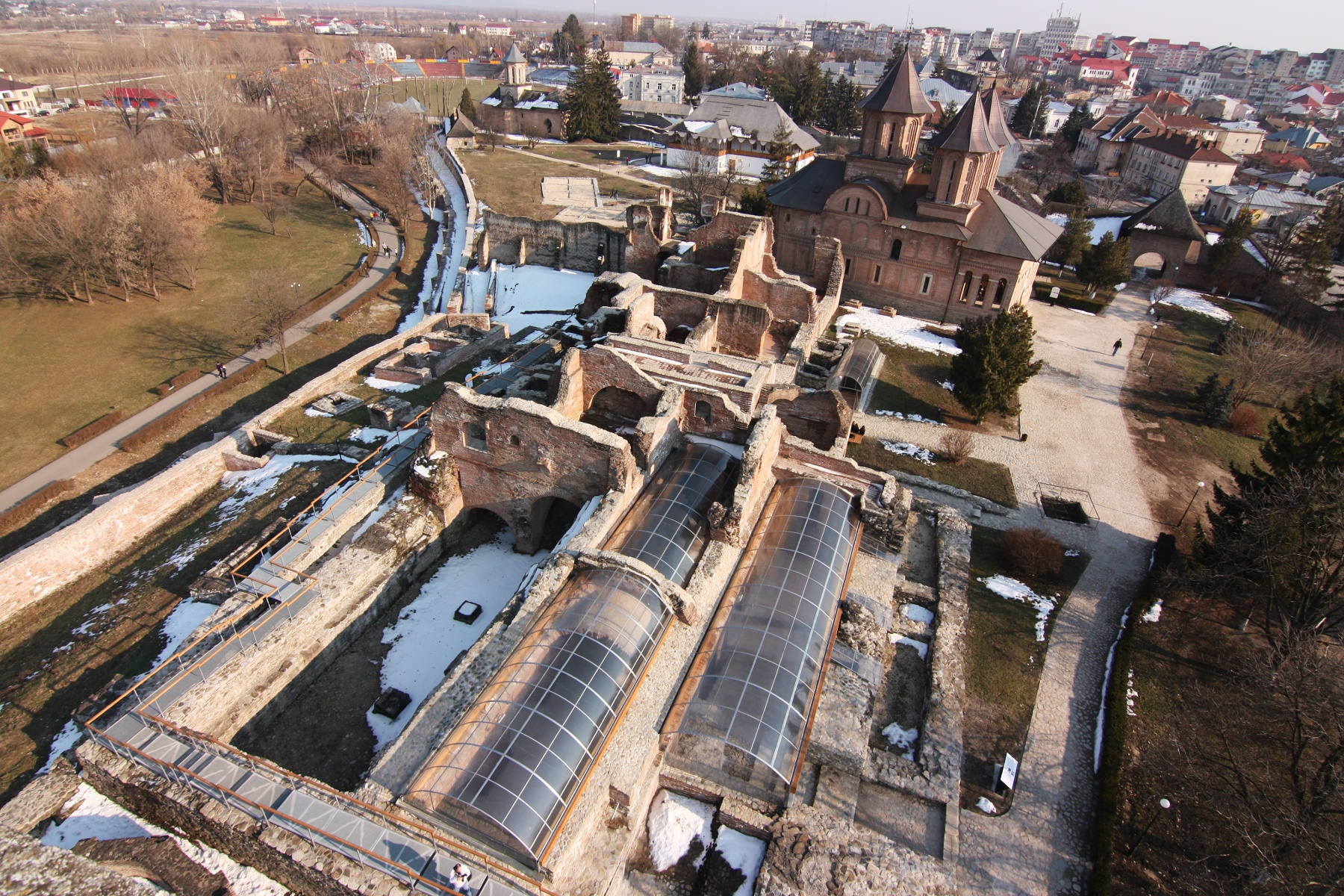

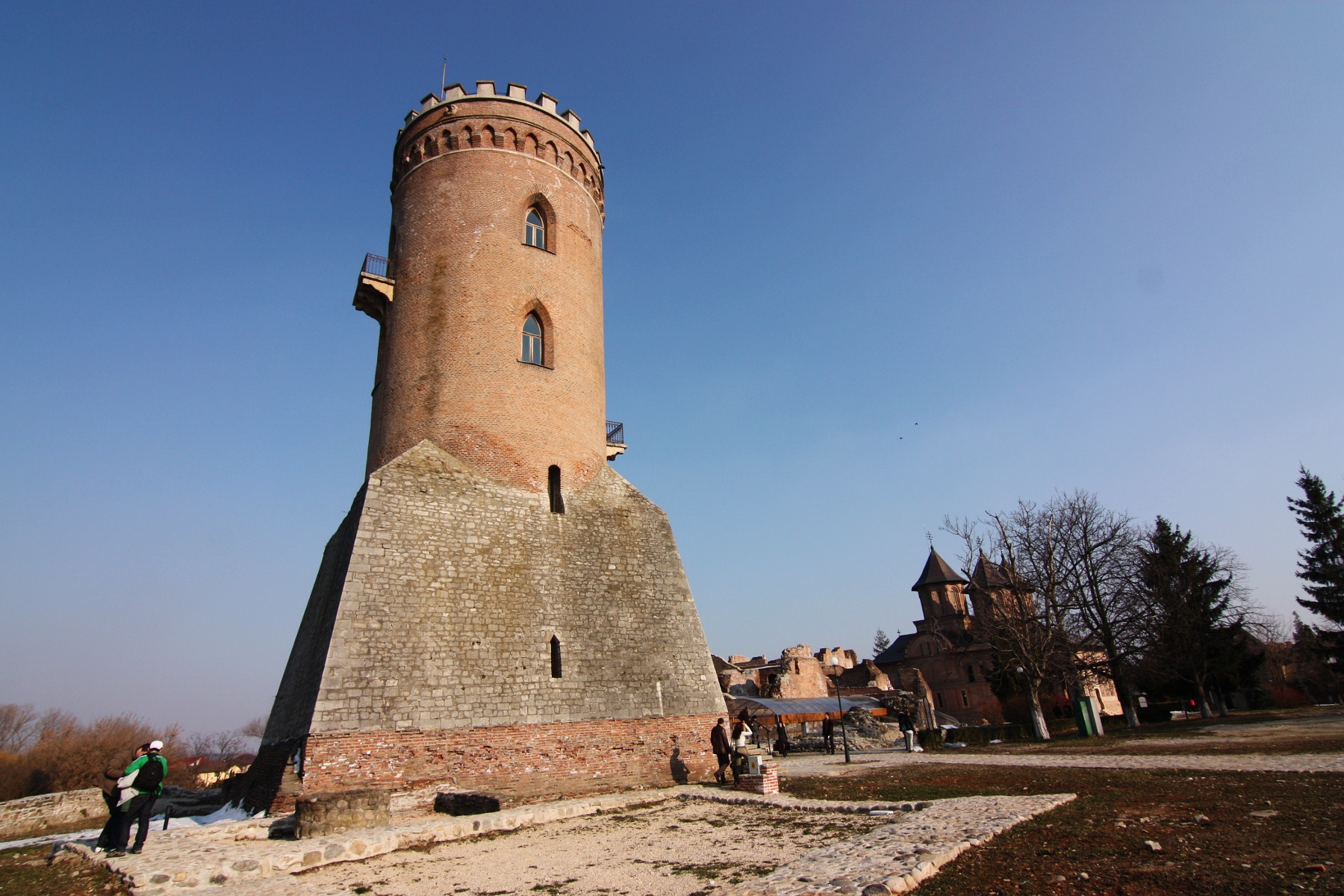

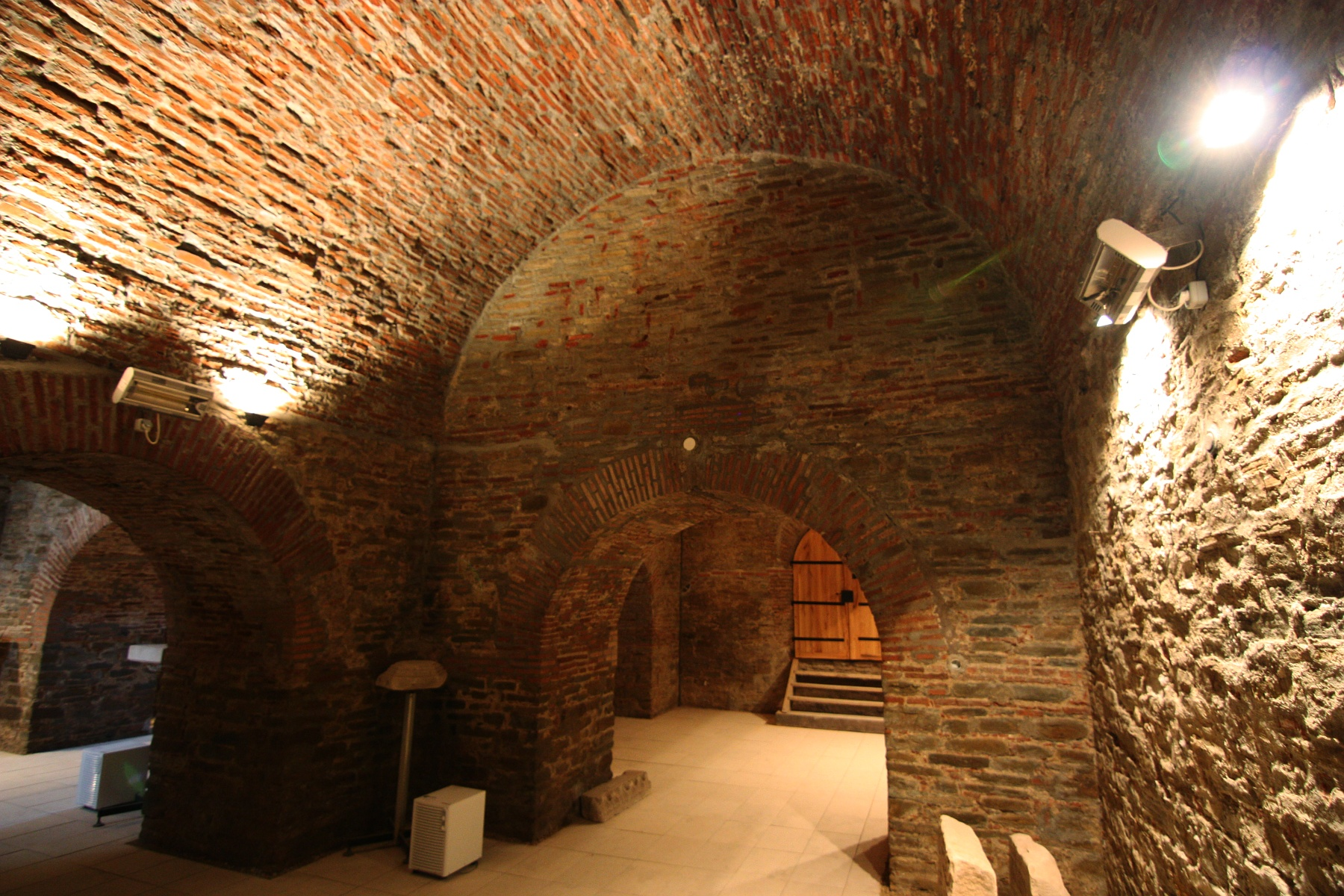

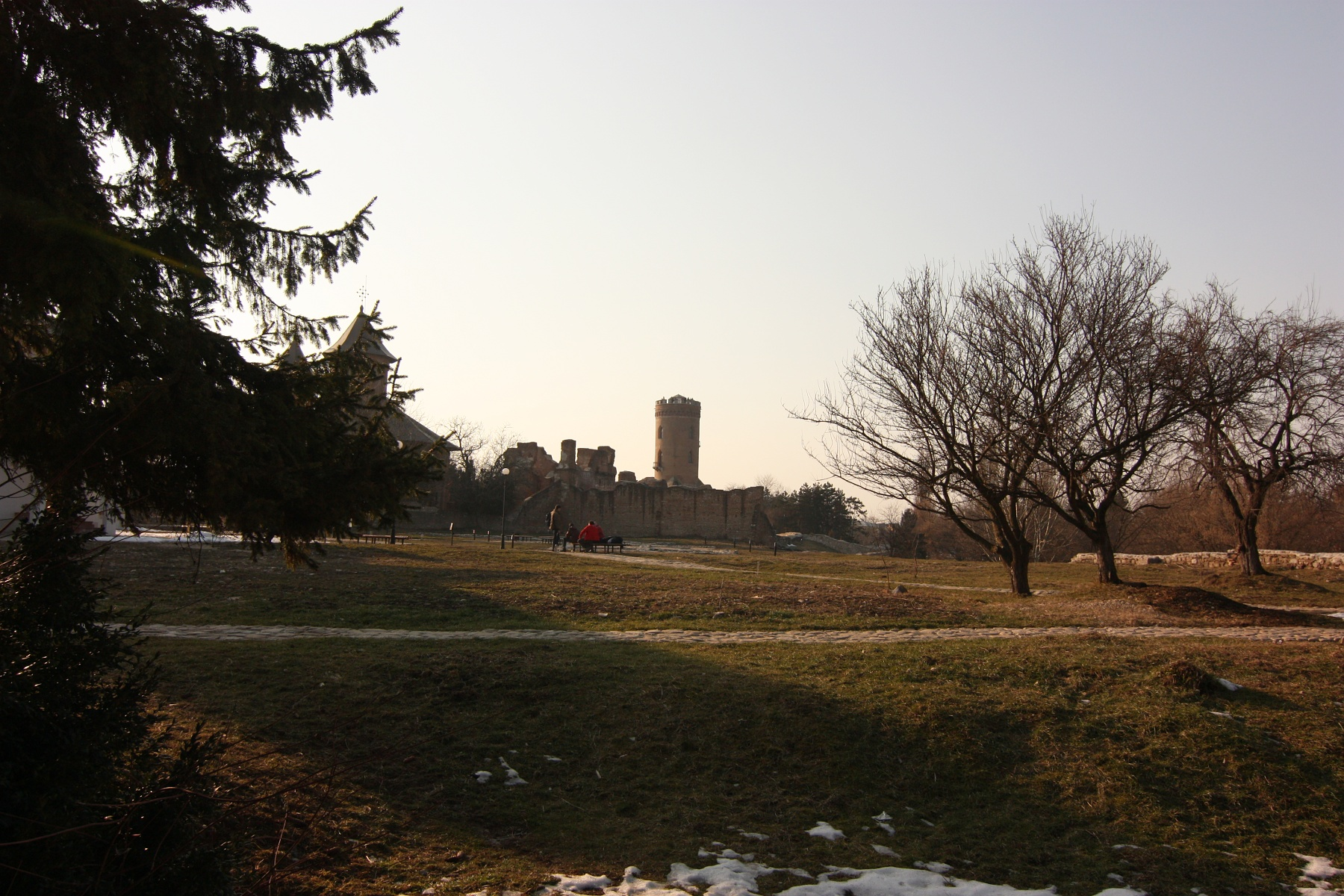

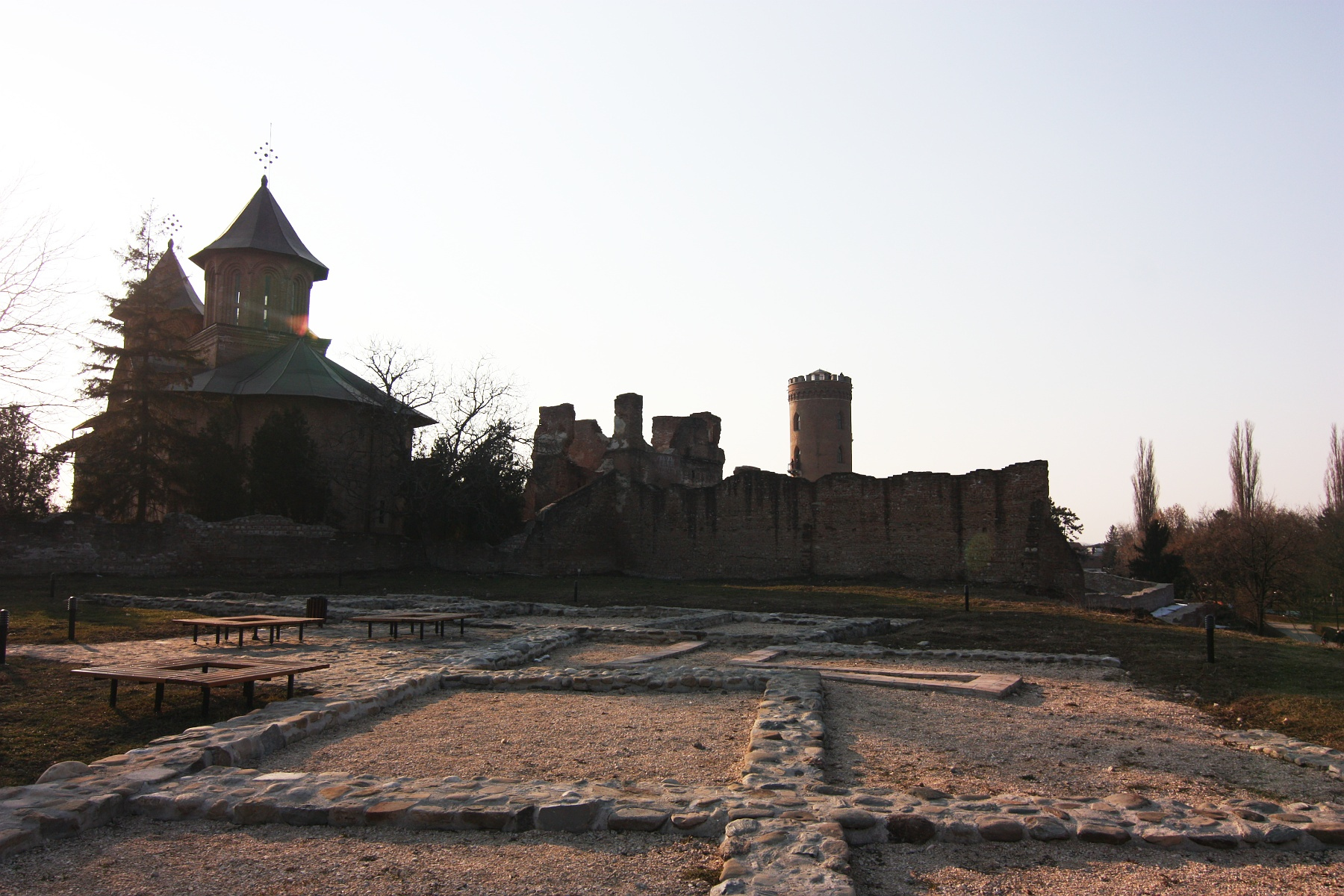

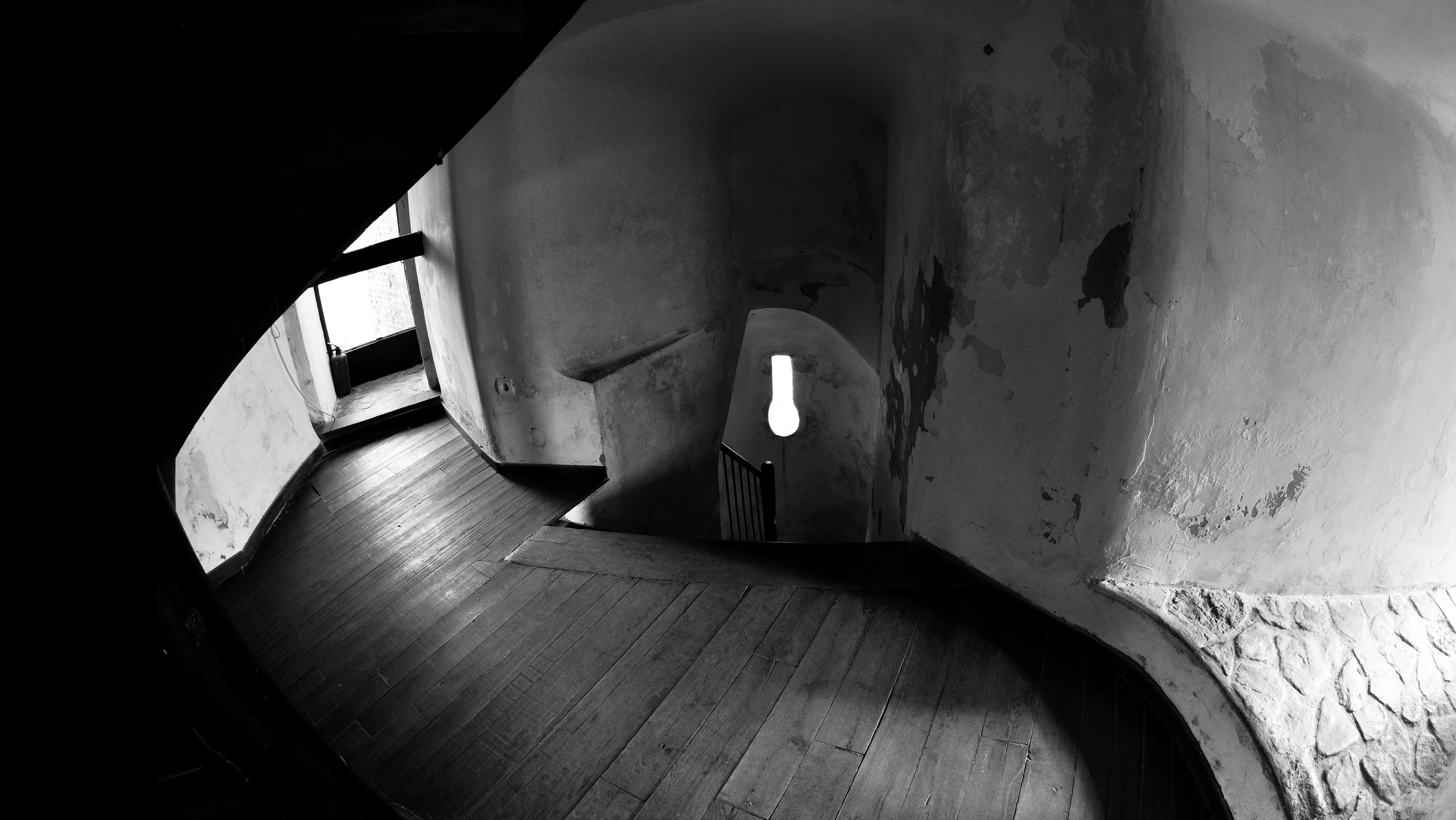

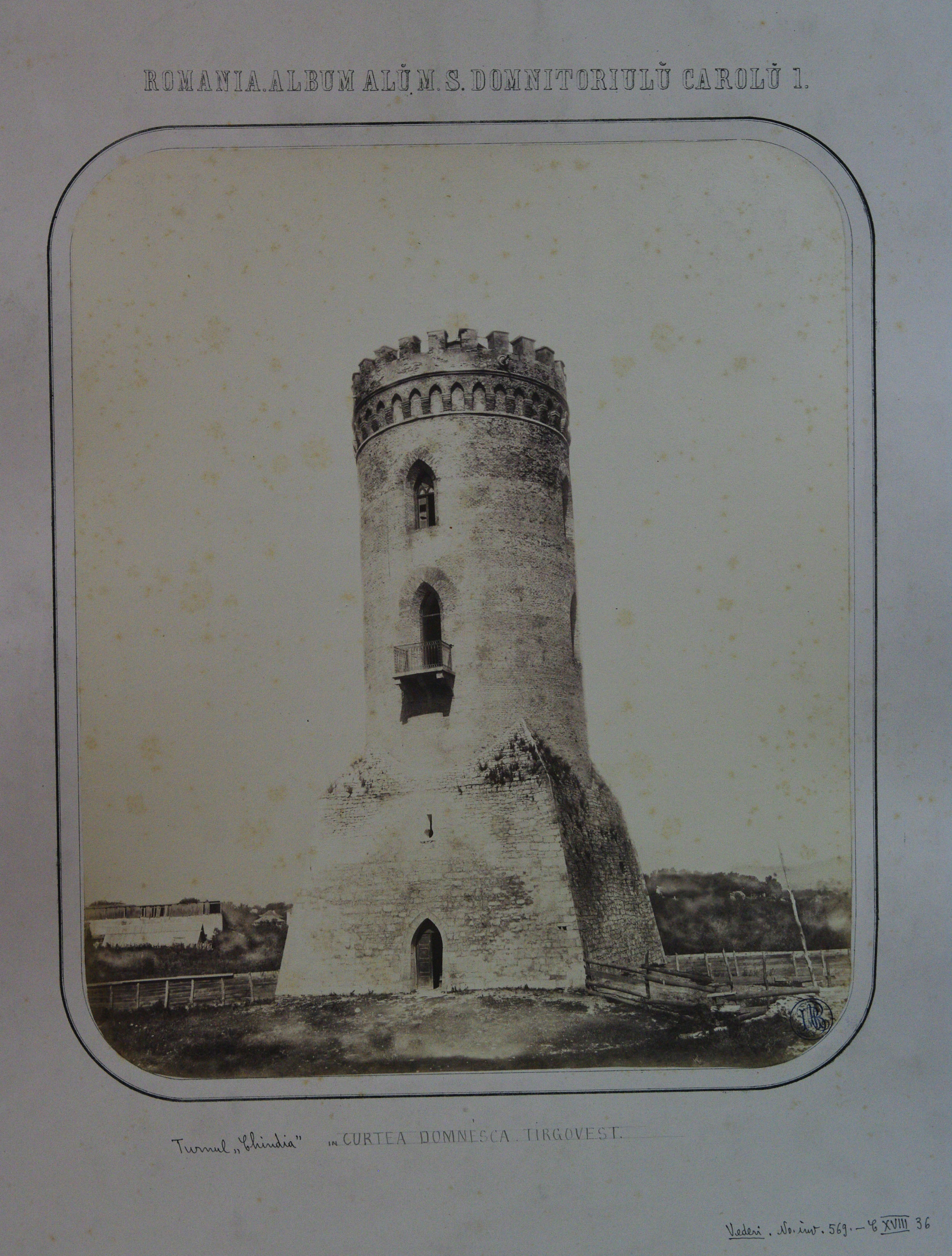
Photograph from 1867 by Carol Szathmari
