= Târgoviște Princely Court =

Complex of medieval buildings and fortifications in Romania

Coordinates: 44°55′56.77″N 25°27′29.43″E

- Curtea Domnească in Târgoviște
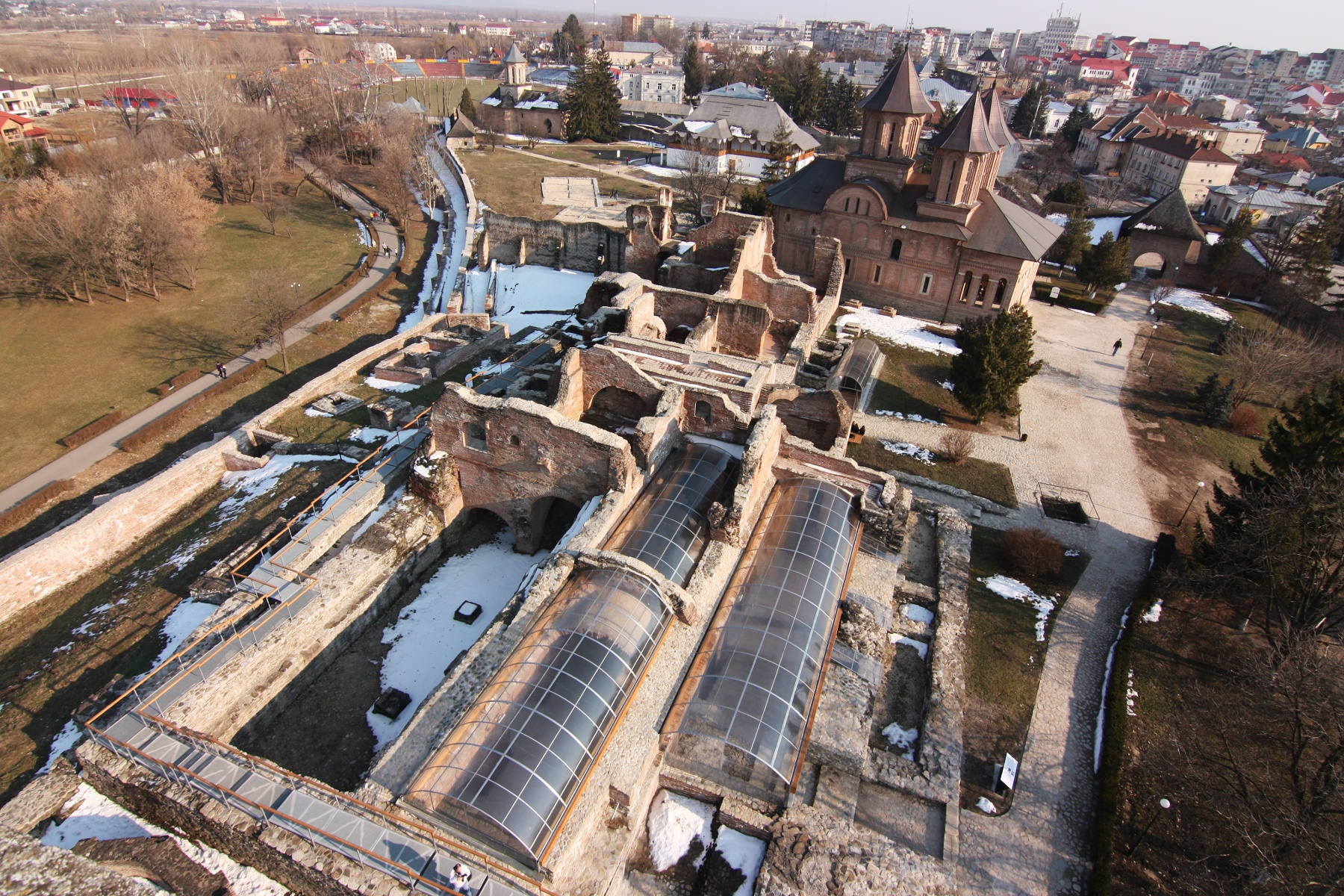
- Aerial view of Curtea Domnească in Târgoviște
- Interactive map of Târgoviște Princely Court
- Location: Târgoviște, Romania
- Type: Complex of medieval buildings and fortifications
- Material: Stone and brick walls, wood (in the past)
- Beginning date: 15th century
- Completion date: 17th century
- Restored date: 1961
- Website: https://muzee-dambovitene.ro/
- Monument Code: DB-II-a-A-17237

Târgoviște Princely Court (Romanian: Curtea Domnească of Târgoviște) represents a complex of medieval buildings and fortifications that served as the residence of various rulers of Wallachia and, at the same time, played a relatively important role in the country's defensive system.

== History ==
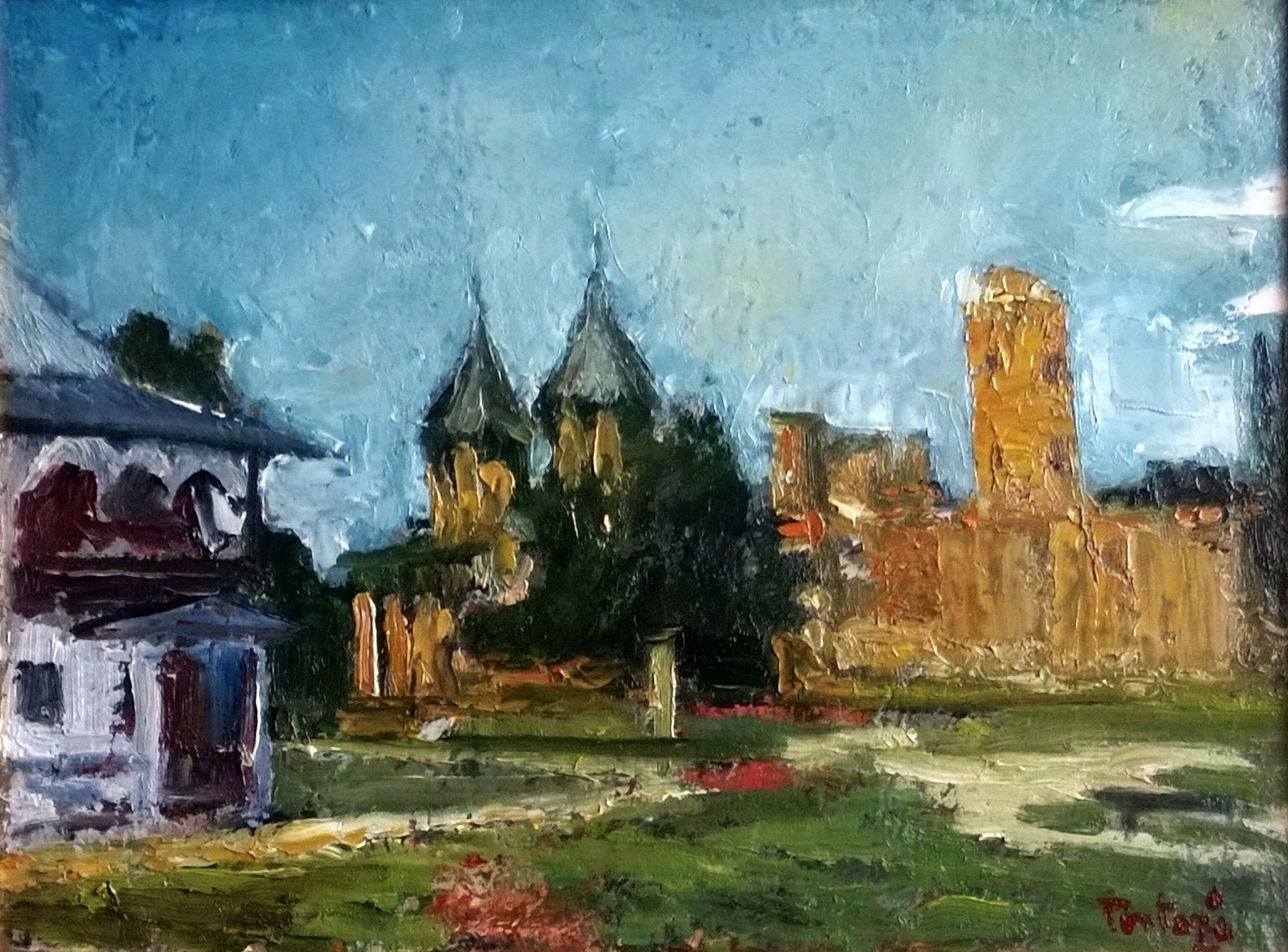
Târgoviște Fortress, painting by Valeriu Pantazi

=== Before XVII ===
In 1427, crusader Johann Schiltberger mentioned Târgoviște as Wallachia's capital alongside Argeș. Although his work was edited 31 years later, it suggests the city had fortifications by 1396.

Internal records attest to the princely court during Mircea the Elder's reign in 1417–1418. Archaeological findings support this, dating back to his time.

Expansion of fortifications occurred half a century later when Târgoviște became the sole Wallachian capital (1431), possibly during Vlad Dracul or Vlad the Impaler's reigns. It's confirmed that after mid-15th century, these fortifications were the country's largest.

Matei Basarab doubled wall thickness, rebuilt the defense ditch, and added 10 bastions. A document from November 17, 1476, mentions the fortress's governor, highlighting its military importance.

Towards the late 16th century, Voivode Petru Cercel expanded the citadel's interior area, also improving utilities.

Unfortunately, the fortifications were tested during the 1653 revolt of the seimeni, leading to their dismantling under Prince Gheorghe Ghica (1659–1660) following an Ottoman request.

=== From Constantin Brâncoveanu until now ===
The impressive development of constructions and architecture during the reign of Constantin Brâncoveanu also touched the Târgoviște Princely Court. With Ottoman consent, the great voivode partially rebuilt the fortifications. Most notably, the princely palace was reconstructed in 1695, along with churches in 1699 and utilitarian or decorative buildings (the stone pavilion within the princely gardens). During this period, two dependencies of the palace were constructed outside the walls: the Casa iazagiului and the Casa coconilor (1701).

Following this period of prosperity and with the canonization of the voivode, along with the permanent relocation of the country's capital to Bucharest, the walls began to deteriorate. The Russo-Turkish War (1735–1739) fought on Romanian territory, severely affected the constructions, leading to a fire at the Princely Court. Later, an earthquake decisively damaged what remained of the fortified enclosure. Some repairs were carried out by Prince Grigore al II-lea Ghica between 1748 and 1752, but they were of poor quality as the palace's vaults collapsed in 1785.

A new fire and earthquake in 1802 led to the definitive ruin of the architectural complex. In 1821, during the Greek War of Independence, Alexandru Ipsilanti, leader of the Eterists, uncovered the defensive ditches and attempted to restore the old fortifications. His attempt to revive the glory days of the medieval citadel ended in embarrassment when news arrived that Ottoman armies were approaching Târgoviște.

These ditches could still be seen until the late 19th century and were studied and described by Cezar Bolliac. Over time and with urban development, the ditches, as well as the enclosure walls, were filled in, with buildings constructed over these irreplaceable vestiges. The last significant restoration and conservation work was carried out in 1961, when the remnants of the old fortifications were opened to tourists in their current state. Since then, only archaeological surveys and minor conservation and improvement works have taken place.

== Buildings in the Curtea Domnească Complex ==
=== Princely Palace ===
The Princely Palace (Palatul Domnesc), constructed during the reign of Constantin Brâncoveanu in 1695, is the centerpiece of the Curtea Domnească complex. It reflects the distinctive architectural style of the period with its beautiful stone carvings, arched doorways, and decorative elements. This palace served as the residence of the voievods and features a series of chambers, each with its unique purpose, including a beautiful chapel.

=== Chindia Tower ===
The Chindia Tower, also known as Turnul Chindiei, is an iconic medieval tower located within the Curtea Domnească complex. Constructed during the reign of Vlad Țepeș in the 15th century, this tower served both defensive and symbolic purposes. With its distinctive octagonal shape and strong stone walls, the Chindia Tower is a testament to the military architecture of the era. It played a crucial role in guarding the princely court and the town of Târgoviște. The tower's name, "Chindia," is believed to be a blend of "Chin" (punishment) and "Din" (from), referring to the punishment chamber located within. Today, the Chindia Tower stands as a significant historical and architectural landmark, offering panoramic views of the surrounding area from its upper levels.

=== Church of the Saint Great Martyr George ===
Biserica Sfântul Mare Mucenic Gheorghe, Built in 1699, this church is a fine example of the Brâncovenesc style of architecture. It boasts intricate frescoes, a finely decorated interior, and an impressive iconostasis. The Church of Saint Great Martyr George has historical and religious significance and has undergone restoration efforts to preserve its original beauty.

=== Stone Pavilion ===
Situated within the princely gardens, the Stone Pavilion (Foișorul de Piatră) is a charming structure built in 1701. It was used for various purposes, including relaxation and hosting important guests. The pavilion features elegant stone columns and a serene atmosphere, making it a notable part of the Curtea Domnească complex.

=== Casa Iazagiului ===
Constructed in 1701 as part of the complex's expansion, Casa Iazagiului (The Iazagi House) served as an additional residence within the grounds. It features architectural elements characteristic of the Brâncovenesc style and was likely used for various administrative and residential purposes during its history.

=== Casa Coconilor ===
Built alongside Casa Iazagiului (The Coconilor House) in 1701, Casa Coconilor is another architectural gem within the Curtea Domnească complex. Its design reflects the Brâncovenesc style and may have been used for accommodating officials or guests visiting the court. Like other structures in the complex, it has historical significance.

=== The Hunters Gate or Dealu Gate ===
From the all five main medieval gates of access in Targoviște - Hunters Gate (Dealu Gate), Buzău Gate, Bucharest Gate, Arges (Câmpulung) Gate – only two of them survived with great difficulties until now. Bucharest Gate and The Hunters Gate. The Hunters' Gate, also known as the Dealu Gate or the Cocoon Gate, was part of the defensive system of the Royal Court. Having fallen into a terrible state of decay over time, the Hunters' Gate entered a complex restoration process in 2023 to restore its former glory and to be reintroduced into the tourist circuit. During 2025, the restoration of the Hunters' Gate was completed, and it can now be visited in Targoviste together with Chindia Tower at the Royal Court, very close to Chindia Park.

=== Other Outbuildings ===
In addition to the major buildings mentioned above, the Curtea Domnească complex includes several other outbuildings, utility structures, and defensive walls. These components were crucial for the functioning and defense of the princely court. While not as prominently featured, they are integral to the historical and architectural significance of the complex.
