= 2010–11 Liga IV =

69th season of the Liga IV, the fourth tier of the Romanian football league

Liga IV
- Season: 2010–11

The 2010–11 Liga IV was the fourth level of the Romanian football league system. It was disputed in each of the 41 counties of Romania and in the municipality of Bucharest. The winner of each series has to play a promotion play-off against a neighbouring county to gain promotion to Liga III.

== Promotion play-off ==
The matches was scheduled to be played on 15 June 2011.

Team 1	Score	Team 2
Vladimirescu (AR)	2–0	(AB) Performanța Ighiu
Unirea Valea lui Mihai (BH)	5–0	(MM) Marmația Sighetu Marmației
Voința Livezile (BN)	3–2	(CJ) Leii Triteni de Jos
Dorohoi (BT)	2–1	(VS) Huși
Forex Brașov (BV)	2–4	(DB) Atletic Fieni
Metaloglobus București (B)	1–2	(GR) Rapid Clejani
Luceafărul C.A. Rosetti (BZ)	0–2	(IL) Viitorul Axintele
Gloria Reșița (CS)	1–0	(MH) Dunărea Pristol
Peștera (CT)	1–2	(BR) Conpet Cireșu
Zagon (CV)	1–1 (a.e.t.) (4–5 p)	(PH) Prahova 2010 Tomșani
Ralbex Turcinești (GJ)	3–2	(DJ) Sopot
ASA Miercurea Ciuc Bălan (HR)	2–4	(BC) Căiuți
Lindab Ștefănești (IF)	3–1	(TR) Viață Nouă Olteni
Energia Girov (NT)	0–1	(IS) Rapid Dumești
Olimpia Satu Mare (SM)	6–0	(SJ) Meseșul Treznea
Sevișul Șelimbăr (SB)	1–2	(AG) Rucăr
Sporting Suceava (SV)	2–1	(MS) FCM Târgu Mureș II
Flacăra Făget (TM)	1–0	(HD) Jiul Petroșani
Eolica Baia (TL)	6–3	(CL) Venus Independența
Damila Măciuca (VL)	1–0	(OT) Recolta Stoicănești
Național Golești (VN)	4–1	(GL) Metalul Toflea

== County leagues ==
=== Alba County ===
Pos	Team	Pld	W	D	L	GF	GA	GD	Pts	Qualification or relegation
1	Performanța Ighiu (C, Q)	30	23	3	4	99	30	+69	72	Qualification to promotion play-off
2	Europa Alba Iulia	30	22	4	4	79	18	+61	70	
3	CSO Cugir	30	20	9	1	95	31	+64	69	
4	FC Cugir	30	15	7	8	94	47	+47	52	
5	Dalia Sport Daia Romană	30	14	8	8	52	39	+13	50	
6	Metalul Aiud	30	15	4	11	48	56	−8	49	
7	Viitorul Sântimbru	30	14	5	11	70	47	+23	47	
8	Ocna Mureș	30	13	5	12	55	51	+4	44	
9	Rapid CFR Teiuș	30	11	5	14	59	64	−5	38	
10	Cuprirom Abrud	30	11	5	14	48	59	−11	38	
11	Mureșul Oarda de Jos	30	10	4	16	39	74	−35	34	
12	Arieșul Apuseni	30	10	3	17	62	87	−25	33	
13	Viitorul Unirea	30	9	5	16	63	86	−23	32	
14	Olimpia Aiud (R)	30	9	3	18	33	62	−29	30	Relegation to Liga V Alba
15	Recolta Galda de Jos (R)	30	5	2	23	22	93	−71	17	Relegation to Liga V Alba
16	Perla Jidvei (R)	30	2	2	26	21	95	−74	8	Relegation to Liga V Alba

Rules for classification: 1) Points; 2) Head-to-head points; 3) Head-to-head goal difference; 4) Head-to-head goals scored; 5) Head-to-head away goals scored; 6) Goal difference; 7) Goals scored.
(C) Champions; (Q) Qualified for the phase indicated; (R) Relegated

=== Arad County ===
Pos	Team	Pld	W	D	L	GF	GA	GD	Pts	Qualification or relegation
1	Vladimirescu (C, Q)	34	26	7	1	105	32	+73	85	Qualification to promotion play-off
2	Voința Mailat	34	21	7	6	68	37	+31	70	
3	Șoimii Tăuț	34	20	7	7	84	47	+37	67	
4	Semlecana Semlac	34	19	7	8	84	46	+38	64	
5	Șoimii Pâncota	34	18	6	10	79	49	+30	60	
6	Progresul Pecica	34	16	8	10	63	52	+11	56	
7	Ineu	34	16	6	12	62	54	+8	54	
8	Aqua Vest Arad	34	16	5	13	55	55	0	53	
9	Victoria Zăbrani	34	15	7	12	63	52	+11	52	
10	Unirea Sântana	34	14	8	12	76	68	+8	50	
11	Unirea Șeitin	34	11	7	16	46	76	−30	40	
12	Frontiera Curtici	34	10	9	15	57	63	−6	39	
13	Crișul Chișineu-Criș	34	12	3	19	61	78	−17	39	
14	Păulișana Păuliș	34	10	5	19	54	88	−34	35	
15	UTA Arad II	34	10	3	21	47	71	−24	33	
16	Viitorul Satu Nou (R)	34	7	7	20	44	77	−33	28	Relegation to Liga V Arad
17	Sânleani (R)	34	6	2	26	24	69	−45	20	Relegation to Liga V Arad
18	Voința Macea (R)	34	4	6	24	37	95	−58	18	Relegation to Liga V Arad

Source: AJF Arad
Rules for classification: 1) Points; 2) Head-to-head points; 3) Head-to-head goal difference; 4) Head-to-head goals scored; 5) Head-to-head away goals scored; 6) Goal difference; 7) Goals scored.
(C) Champions; (Q) Qualified for the phase indicated; (R) Relegated

=== Argeș County ===
Pos	Team	Pld	W	D	L	GF	GA	GD	Pts	Qualification or relegation
1	Rucăr (C, Q)	30	28	1	1	129	17	+112	85	Qualification to promotion play-off
2	Rapid Pitești	30	26	2	2	96	24	+72	80	
3	Dinamic Mioveni	30	20	0	10	80	56	+24	60	
4	Bascov	30	18	2	10	73	48	+25	56	
5	Viitorul Ștefănești	30	17	4	9	62	32	+30	55	
6	Olimpia Suseni	30	16	1	13	65	44	+21	49	
7	Sporting Pitești	30	15	3	12	59	47	+12	48	
8	Stâlpeni Rădești	30	12	4	14	50	55	−5	40	
9	Steaua Negrași	30	11	6	13	43	48	−5	39	
10	Miroși	30	11	4	15	38	59	−21	37	
11	Domnești	30	11	3	16	53	95	−42	36	
12	DLR Pitești	30	11	1	18	53	86	−33	34	
13	Unirea Costești	30	8	3	19	48	78	−30	27	
14	FC Dănuț Coman (Note: FC Dănuț Coman was spared from relegation due to the promotion of Rucăr in Liga III.)	30	7	2	21	40	75	−35	23	Spared from relegation
15	Argeș Pitești II (R)	30	5	1	24	30	96	−66	16	Relegation to Liga V Argeș
16	Top Arena Topoloveni (R)	30	4	3	23	42	101	−59	15	Relegation to Liga V Argeș

Rules for classification: 1) Points; 2) Head-to-head points; 3) Head-to-head goal difference; 4) Head-to-head goals scored; 5) Head-to-head away goals scored; 6) Goal difference; 7) Goals scored.
(C) Champions; (Q) Qualified for the phase indicated; (R) Relegated

=== Bacău County ===
Pos	Team	Pld	W	D	L	GF	GA	GD	Pts	Qualification or relegation
1	Căiuți (C, Q)	34	26	5	3	92	25	+67	83	Qualification to promotion play-off
2	Mondosport Bacău	34	26	4	4	119	37	+82	82	
3	Sport Club Bacău II	34	26	2	6	106	39	+67	80	
4	Moinești	34	22	4	8	106	42	+64	70	
5	Nicolae Bălcescu	34	19	6	9	84	55	+29	63	
6	Biruința Bacău	34	18	3	13	74	47	+27	57	
7	Aerostar Bacău II	34	18	2	14	65	56	+9	56	
8	Filipești	34	15	5	14	76	79	−3	50	
9	Consart Șerbănești	34	14	3	17	83	90	−7	45	
10	Uzu Dărmănești	34	11	6	17	52	59	−7	39	
11	Târgu Ocna	34	11	4	19	53	94	−41	37	
12	Negri	34	11	3	20	61	82	−21	36	
13	Athletic Comănești	34	9	7	18	68	86	−18	34	
14	FCM Onești II	34	10	4	20	56	91	−35	34	
15	Voința Oituz (O)	34	9	6	19	41	75	−34	33	Qualification to relegation play-off
16	Voința Gârleni (O)	34	10	2	22	51	100	−49	32	Qualification to relegation play-off
17	Dofteana (R)	34	9	4	21	46	104	−58	31	Relegation to Liga V Bacău
18	Siretu (R)	34	5	4	25	47	119	−72	19	Relegation to Liga V Bacău

Rules for classification: 1) Points; 2) Head-to-head points; 3) Head-to-head goal difference; 4) Head-to-head goals scored; 5) Head-to-head away goals scored; 6) Goal difference; 7) Goals scored.
(C) Champions; (O) Play-off winners; (Q) Qualified for the phase indicated; (R) Relegated

Relegation play-off

The 15th and 16th-placed teams of the Liga IV faces the 2nd placed teams from the two series of Liga V Bacău.

Team 1	Score	Team 2
Voința Gârleni	11–1	Silvolemn Comănești
Voința Oituz	3–1	Flamura Roșie Sascut

=== Bihor County ===
Pos	Team	Pld	W	D	L	GF	GA	GD	Pts	Qualification or relegation
1	Unirea Valea lui Mihai (C, Q)	30	26	1	3	109	26	+83	79	Qualification for promotion play-off
2	Luceafărul Oradea II	30	25	3	2	141	38	+103	78	
3	Sânmartin	30	22	4	4	108	24	+84	70	
4	Poiana Budureasa	30	20	6	4	96	36	+60	66	
5	Cetatea Biharia	30	16	5	9	75	67	+8	53	
6	Tricolorul Alparea	30	15	6	9	94	57	+37	51	
7	Crișul Aleșd	30	15	3	12	55	61	−6	48	
8	Locadin Țețchea	30	13	4	13	69	75	−6	43	
9	Stăruința Săcuieni	30	11	2	17	57	93	−36	35	
10	Viitorul Popești	30	9	3	18	58	78	−20	30	
11	Kinder Junior Oradea	30	8	4	18	41	100	−59	28	
12	Biharea Vașcău	30	9	0	21	43	69	−26	27	
13	Liberty Salonta	30	8	1	21	64	105	−41	25	
14	Victoria Avram Iancu (Note: Victoria Avram Iancu was spared from relegation due to the promotion of Unirea Valea lui Mihai in Liga III.)	30	7	4	19	52	97	−45	25	Spared from relegation
15	Izvorul Cociuba Mare (R)	30	7	3	20	57	121	−64	24	Relegation to Liga V Bihor
16	Frontiera Oradea (R)	30	4	1	25	32	106	−74	13	Relegation to Liga V Bihor

Rules for classification: Rules for classification: 1) Points 2) Head-to-head points; 3) Head-to-head goal difference; 4) Head-to-head goals scored; 5) Head-to-head away goals scored; 6) Goal difference; 7) Goals scored.
(C) Champions; (Q) Qualified for the phase indicated; (R) Relegated

=== Bistrița-Năsăud County ===
Pos	Team	Pld	W	D	L	GF	GA	GD	Pts	Qualification or relegation
1	Voința Livezile (C, Q)	28	22	2	4	90	22	+68	68	Qualification to promotion play-off
2	Șoimii Romuli	28	19	2	7	90	37	+53	59	
3	Heniu Prundu Bârgăului	28	18	1	9	76	41	+35	55	
4	Gironic Rebra	28	15	5	8	78	42	+36	50	
5	Victoria Uriu	28	15	1	12	65	62	+3	46	
6	Viitorul Lechința	28	13	3	12	71	65	+6	42	
7	Voința Cetate	28	11	2	15	37	70	−33	35	
8	Rapid Budac	28	11	1	16	47	79	−32	34	
9	Silvicultorul Maieru	28	10	4	14	56	90	−34	34	
10	ProSomeș Feldru	28	10	3	15	58	68	−10	33	
11	Progresul Năsăud	28	10	2	16	35	51	−16	32	
12	Universitatea Șirioara	28	9	5	14	51	73	−22	32	
13	Progresul Jelna	28	9	3	16	48	61	−13	30	
14	Eciro Forest Telciu (O)	28	9	3	16	45	59	−14	30	Qualification to relegation play-off
15	Steaua Monariu (O)	28	8	5	15	46	73	−27	29	Qualification to relegation play-off
16	Someșul Rebrișoara (D)	0	0	0	0	0	0	0	0 (Note: Someșul Rebrișoara withdrew in the first part of the season and all its results were canceled.)	Withdrew

Rules for classification: 1) Points; 2) Head-to-head points; 3) Head-to-head goal difference; 4) Head-to-head goals scored; 5) Head-to-head away goals scored; 6) Goal difference; 7) Goals scored.
(C) Champions; (D) Disqualified; (O) Play-off winners; (Q) Qualified for the phase indicated
Notes:

Relegation play-off

The 14th and 15th-placed teams of the Liga IV faces the 2nd placed teams from the two series of Liga V Bistrița-Năsăud.

Team 1	Score	Team 2
Eciro Forest Telciu	4–0	Luceafărul Șieu
Steaua Monariu	2–1	Viticola Dumitra

=== Botoșani County ===
Pos	Team	Pld	W	D	L	GF	GA	GD	Pts	Qualification or relegation
1	Botoșani II (C)	24	20	2	2	88	24	+64	62 (Note: Botosani II were not eligible for promotion, Dorohoi qualified for promotion play-off.)	Ineligible for promotion
2	Dorohoi (Q)	24	19	3	2	75	21	+54	60	Qualification to promotion play-off
3	Roma	24	16	4	4	59	30	+29	52	
4	Păltiniș	24	11	4	9	41	33	+8	37	
5	Darabani	24	10	6	8	34	31	+3	36	
6	Prosport Vârfu Câmpului	24	10	2	12	40	60	−20	32	
7	Nord Star Pomârla	24	9	4	11	37	40	−3	31	
8	Avântul Albești	24	9	3	12	44	62	−18	30	
9	Rapid Ungureni	24	8	4	12	41	60	−19	28	
10	Sportivul Trușești	24	7	6	11	51	55	−4	27	
11	Bucecea (O)	24	6	4	14	34	56	−22	22	Qualification to relegation play-off
12	Bucovina Rogojești (O)	24	6	3	15	31	60	−29	21	Qualification to relegation play-off
13	Concești (R)	24	1	3	20	24	67	−43	6	Relegation to Liga V Botoșani
14	Leorda (D)	0	0	0	0	0	0	0	0 (Note: Leorda withdrew after three rounds and all its results were canceled.)	Withdrew

Rules for classification: 1) Points; 2) Head-to-head points; 3) Head-to-head goal difference; 4) Head-to-head goals scored; 5) Head-to-head away goals scored; 6) Goal difference; 7) Goals scored.
(C) Champions; (D) Disqualified; (O) Play-off winners; (Q) Qualified for the phase indicated; (R) Relegated
Notes:

Relegation play-off

The 11th and 12th-placed teams of the Liga IV faces the 2nd placed teams from the two series of Liga V Botoșani.

Team 1	Score	Team 2
Flacăra 1907 Flămânzi	0–2	Bucecea
Bucovina Rogojești	4–2	Speranța Dumbrăvița

=== Brașov County ===
Pos	Team	Pld	W	D	L	GF	GA	GD	Pts	Qualification or relegation
1	Forex Brașov (C, Q)	34	25	5	4	83	21	+62	80	Qualification to promotion play-off
2	Făgăraș	34	22	7	5	101	32	+69	73	
3	Olimpia Sânpetru	34	21	6	7	95	31	+64	69	
4	Viitorul Ghimbav	34	20	5	9	80	34	+46	65	
5	Înfrățirea Hărman	34	19	4	11	69	41	+28	61	
6	Inter Cristian	34	16	10	8	70	42	+28	58	
7	Jibert	34	16	4	14	63	52	+11	52	
8	Râșnov	34	13	13	8	69	53	+16	52	
9	Viromet Victoria	34	16	3	15	71	78	−7	51	
10	Zărnești	34	14	8	12	64	49	+15	50	
11	Cetatea Rupea	34	15	5	14	58	57	+1	50	
12	Energia Unirea Feldioara	34	10	8	16	46	65	−19	38	
13	Aripile Brașov	34	11	4	19	43	70	−27	37	
14	CFR Brașov	34	12	0	22	47	89	−42	36	
15	Carpați Berivoi	34	10	4	20	64	83	−19	34	
16	Olimpic Voila (R)	34	9	4	21	37	85	−48	31	Relegation to Liga V Brașov
17	Ghimbav 2000 (R)	34	7	4	23	56	83	−27	25	Relegation to Liga V Brașov
18	Cața (R)	34	1	4	29	29	180	−151	7	Relegation to Liga V Brașov

Rules for classification: 1) Points; 2) Head-to-head points; 3) Head-to-head goal difference; 4) Head-to-head goals scored; 5) Head-to-head away goals scored; 6) Goal difference; 7) Goals scored.
(C) Champions; (Q) Qualified for the phase indicated; (R) Relegated

=== Brăila County ===
Pos	Team	Pld	W	D	L	GF	GA	GD	Pts	Qualification or relegation
1	Avântul Conpet Cireșu (C, Q)	30	26	2	2	138	15	+123	80	Qualification to promotion play-off
2	Victoria Traian	30	23	4	3	93	30	+63	73	
3	Recolta Tufești	30	20	5	5	112	37	+75	65	
4	Atletic Brăila	30	20	3	7	88	43	+45	63	
5	Fortino Ianca	30	18	5	7	104	45	+59	59	
6	Dunărea Gropeni	30	18	4	8	94	44	+50	58	
7	Sportul Chiscani	30	16	3	11	79	68	+11	51	
8	Viitorul Galbenu	30	15	3	12	83	76	+7	48	
9	Făurei	30	14	4	12	55	47	+8	46	
10	Voința Vișani	30	11	3	16	64	83	−19	36	
11	Victoria Dedulești	30	8	3	19	57	110	−53	27	
12	Victoria Cazasu	30	7	3	20	39	75	−36	24	
13	Avântul Mircea Vodă	30	4	4	22	39	106	−67	16	
14	Dunărea Tichilești	30	3	7	20	32	127	−95	16	
15	Voința Surdila-Găiseanca (R)	30	4	3	23	30	128	−98	15	Relegation to Liga V Brăila
16	Gloria Movila Miresii (R)	30	3	4	23	33	106	−73	13	Relegation to Liga V Brăila

Rules for classification: 1) Points; 2) Head-to-head points; 3) Head-to-head goal difference; 4) Head-to-head goals scored; 5) Head-to-head away goals scored; 6) Goal difference; 7) Goals scored.
(C) Champions; (Q) Qualified for the phase indicated; (R) Relegated

=== Bucharest ===
Series I

Pos	Team	Pld	W	D	L	GF	GA	GD	Pts	Qualification or relegation
1	Concordia Chiajna II	18	14	2	2	52	12	+40	44	Qualification to first play-off
2	Sportul Studențesc București II	16	12	2	2	70	15	+55	38	Qualification to first play-off
3	Metaloglobus București	16	10	4	2	41	11	+30	34	Qualification to first play-off
4	Chitila	17	10	1	6	49	17	+32	31	
5	Unirea Tricolor București	16	10	1	5	33	18	+15	31	Qualification to first play-off
6	Longevity București	17	9	2	6	40	27	+13	29	
7	Termo București	17	8	2	7	33	27	+6	20 (Note: Termo București deducted 6 points.)	
8	Progresul București	16	6	0	10	29	44	−15	18	
9	Aversa București	16	4	0	12	23	71	−48	12	
10	Coresi București	17	3	0	14	17	63	−46	9	
11	Tracțiunea București	17	0	0	17	12	89	−77	0 (Note: Tracțiunea București withdrew in the second part of the season and lost all remaining matches with 0–3.)	
12	Juventus București II	0	0	0	0	0	0	0	0 (Note: Juventus București II withdrew in the first part of the season and all its results were canceled.)	Withdrew

Rules for classification: 1) Points; 2) Head-to-head points; 3) Head-to-head goal difference; 4) Head-to-head goals scored; 5) Head-to-head away goals scored; 6) Goal difference; 7) Goals scored.
Notes:

Series II

Pos	Team	Pld	W	D	L	GF	GA	GD	Pts	Qualification or relegation
1	Progresul Cernica	18	15	2	1	71	5	+66	47	Qualification to first play-off
2	Calcio București	18	12	2	4	49	12	+37	38	Qualification to first play-off
3	Voluntari II	18	11	1	6	52	28	+24	34	Qualification to first play-off
4	Inter Clinceni II	17	11	0	6	39	15	+24	33	
5	Viitorul București	17	8	4	5	39	21	+18	28	Qualification to first play-off
6	Electroaparataj București	18	8	4	6	31	31	0	28	
7	Pantelimon	18	7	3	8	32	29	+3	24	
8	Marius Lăcătuș București	17	7	1	9	29	51	−22	22	
9	Sportul Studențesc București III	18	4	6	8	21	39	−18	18	
10	Cautis București	18	4	2	12	29	51	−22	14	
11	Romprim București	17	4	2	11	17	48	−31	14	
12	Frăția București	18	2	1	15	15	88	−73	7	

Rules for classification: 1) Points; 2) Head-to-head points; 3) Head-to-head goal difference; 4) Head-to-head goals scored; 5) Head-to-head away goals scored; 6) Goal difference; 7) Goals scored.

Series III

Pos	Team	Pld	W	D	L	GF	GA	GD	Pts	Qualification or relegation
1	Viitorul Jilava	20	17	0	3	55	15	+40	51	Qualification to first play-off
2	LPS Mircea Eliade București	20	14	3	3	40	16	+24	45	Qualification to first play-off
3	LSM București	19	11	3	5	32	13	+19	36	Qualification to first play-off
4	Nida Popești-Leordeni	20	11	3	6	51	38	+13	36	Qualification to first play-off
5	Poli Timișoara	20	10	1	9	50	43	+7	31	
6	Smart Ionescu	20	8	6	6	34	24	+10	30	
7	Pressing București	20	10	0	10	28	32	−4	30	
8	Electrica București	19	9	1	9	41	50	−9	28	
9	1 Decembrie	19	7	3	9	31	27	+4	24	
10	Ilie Oană București	19	7	2	10	30	38	−8	23	
11	Cadet București	19	6	1	12	37	42	−5	19	
12	Juniorul București	19	3	1	15	24	70	−46	10	
13	Smart Ionescu II	18	0	0	18	0	54	−54	0 (Note: Smart Ionescu II lost all matches with 0–3.)	
14	ICSIM București (D)	0	0	0	0	0	0	0	0 (Note: ICSIM București withdrew in the first part of the season and all its results were canceled.)	Withdrew

Rules for classification: 1) Points; 2) Head-to-head points; 3) Head-to-head goal difference; 4) Head-to-head goals scored; 5) Head-to-head away goals scored; 6) Goal difference; 7) Goals scored.
(D) Disqualified
Notes:

First play-off
Group 1

Pos	Team	Pld	W	D	L	GF	GA	GD	Pts	Qualification	CCH	UTB	SP2	VBU
1	Concordia Chiajna II (Q)	3	2	1	0	10	0	+10	7	Qualification to second play-off		1–0		9–0
2	Unirea Tricolor București (Q)	3	2	0	1	3	2	+1	6	Qualification to second play-off				1–0
3	Sportul Studențesc București II	3	1	1	1	12	2	+10	4		0–0	1–2		
4	Viitorul București	3	0	0	3	0	21	−21	0				0–11	

Rules for classification: 1) Points; 2) Head-to-head points; 3) Head-to-head goal difference; 4) Head-to-head goals scored; 5) Head-to-head away goals scored; 6) Goal difference; 7) Goals scored.
(Q) Qualified for the phase indicated

Group 2

Pos	Team	Pld	W	D	L	GF	GA	GD	Pts	Qualification	PRC	LME	NPL	ICL
1	Progresul Cernica (Q)	3	3	0	0	12	0	+12	9	Qualification to second play-off			5–0	6–0
2	LPS Mircea Eliade București (Q)	3	2	0	1	5	1	+4	6	Qualification to second play-off	0–1			
3	Nida Popești-Leordeni	3	0	1	2	2	10	−8	1			0–3		
4	Inter Clinceni II	3	0	1	2	2	10	−8	1			0–2	2–2	

Rules for classification: 1) Points; 2) Head-to-head points; 3) Head-to-head goal difference; 4) Head-to-head goals scored; 5) Head-to-head away goals scored; 6) Goal difference; 7) Goals scored.
(Q) Qualified for the phase indicated

Group 3

Pos	Team	Pld	W	D	L	GF	GA	GD	Pts	Qualification	MBU	VJI	CAB	LSM
1	Metaloglobus București (Q)	3	2	1	0	10	2	+8	7	Qualification to second play-off		0–0		5–1
2	Viitorul Jilava (Q)	3	2	1	0	4	1	+3	7	Qualification to second play-off				2–1
3	Calcio București	3	1	0	2	6	8	−2	3		1–5	0–2		
4	LSM București	3	0	0	3	3	12	−9	0				1–5	

Rules for classification: 1) Points; 2) Head-to-head points; 3) Head-to-head goal difference; 4) Head-to-head goals scored; 5) Head-to-head away goals scored; 6) Goal difference; 7) Goals scored.
(Q) Qualified for the phase indicated

Second play-off
Group 1

Pos	Team	Pld	W	D	L	GF	GA	GD	Pts	Qualification
1	Concordia Chiajna II	2	2	0	0	5	0	+5	6	Qualification to final
2	Viitorul Jilava	2	1	0	1	1	2	−1	3	
3	LPS Mircea Eliade București	2	0	0	2	0	4	−4	0	

Rules for classification: 1) Points; 2) Head-to-head points; 3) Head-to-head goal difference; 4) Head-to-head goals scored; 5) Head-to-head away goals scored; 6) Goal difference; 7) Goals scored.

Group 2

Pos	Team	Pld	W	D	L	GF	GA	GD	Pts	Qualification
1	Metaloglobus București	2	1	1	0	6	4	+2	4	Qualification to final
2	Unirea Tricolor București	2	0	2	0	1	1	0	2	
3	Progresul Cernica	2	0	1	1	3	5	−2	1	

Rules for classification: 1) Points; 2) Head-to-head points; 3) Head-to-head goal difference; 4) Head-to-head goals scored; 5) Head-to-head away goals scored; 6) Goal difference; 7) Goals scored.

Final

Team 1	Score	Team 2
Metaloglobus București	3–2 (aet)	Concordia Chiajna II

Metaloglobus București won the 2010–11 Liga IV Bucharest and qualify to promotion play-off in Liga III.

=== Buzău County ===
Series I

Pos	Team	Pld	W	D	L	GF	GA	GD	Pts	Qualification or relegation
1	Viitorul Tisău (Q)	22	16	2	4	63	32	+31	50	Qualification to championship play-off
2	Șoimii Costești	22	15	4	3	60	18	+42	49	
3	Recolta Cislău	22	15	4	3	58	26	+32	49	
4	Foresta Nehoiu	17	9	4	4	38	27	+11	31	
5	Șoimii Siriu	18	6	6	6	35	29	+6	24	
6	Progresul Pătârlagele	18	4	7	7	26	30	−4	19	
7	Petrolul Berca	18	5	4	9	23	27	−4	19	
8	Viitorul Vernești	18	5	3	10	30	49	−19	18	
9	Victoria Boboc	17	4	5	8	30	42	−12	17	
10	Cereanim Smeeni	18	4	5	9	35	54	−19	17	
11	Avântul Chiojdu	18	3	7	8	27	56	−29	16	
12	Inter Cănești	18	4	2	12	27	49	−22	14	

Rules for classification: 1) Points; 2) Head-to-head points; 3) Head-to-head goal difference; 4) Head-to-head goals scored; 5) Head-to-head away goals scored; 6) Goal difference; 7) Goals scored.
(Q) Qualified for the phase indicated

Series II

Pos	Team	Pld	W	D	L	GF	GA	GD	Pts	Qualification or relegation
1	Luceafărul C.A.Rosetti (Q)	22	18	2	2	64	27	+37	56	Qualification to championship play-off
2	Olimpia Pogoanele	22	13	5	4	60	41	+19	44	
3	Unirea Stâlpu	22	13	4	5	39	29	+10	43	
4	Locomotiva Buzău	18	10	1	7	44	29	+15	31	
5	Steaua Săhăteni	18	9	1	8	33	25	+8	28	
6	Voința Limpeziș	18	9	0	9	48	38	+10	27	
7	Tricolorul Gălbinași	19	8	2	9	33	31	+2	26	
8	Metalul Buzău	18	7	2	9	32	35	−3	23	
9	Voința Florica	18	6	3	9	40	44	−4	21	
10	Pescărușul Luciu	18	5	2	11	27	34	−7	17	
11	ASA Mărăcineni	18	4	3	11	26	49	−23	15	
12	Luceafărul Maxenu	18	4	2	12	22	57	−35	14	

Rules for classification: 1) Points; 2) Head-to-head points; 3) Head-to-head goal difference; 4) Head-to-head goals scored; 5) Head-to-head away goals scored; 6) Goal difference; 7) Goals scored.
(Q) Qualified for the phase indicated

Series III

Pos	Team	Pld	W	D	L	GF	GA	GD	Pts	Qualification or relegation
1	Victoria Buda (Q)	22	18	1	3	75	29	+46	55	Qualification to championship play-off
2	Voința Lanuri	22	15	1	6	70	28	+42	46	
3	Recolta Boldu	22	12	4	6	47	30	+17	40	
4	Spartac Poșta Câlnău	18	11	2	5	45	36	+9	35	
5	Progresul Beceni	18	9	2	7	31	26	+5	29	
6	Gloria Vadu Pașii	18	9	2	7	29	30	−1	29	
7	Săgeata	18	7	3	8	28	41	−13	24	
8	LPS Buzău	18	6	3	9	35	37	−2	21	
9	Înfrățirea Zoița	18	6	2	10	18	29	−11	20	
10	Unirea Mărăcineni	18	4	4	10	27	39	−12	16	
11	Avântul Zărnești	18	4	3	11	25	52	−27	15	
12	Valconf Valea Râmnicului	18	2	2	14	20	46	−26	8	

Rules for classification: 1) Points; 2) Head-to-head points; 3) Head-to-head goal difference; 4) Head-to-head goals scored; 5) Head-to-head away goals scored; 6) Goal difference; 7) Goals scored.
(Q) Qualified for the phase indicated

Championship play-off

Pos	Team	Pld	W	D	L	GF	GA	GD	Pts	Qualification	LUC	VBU	VTI
1	Luceafărul C.A.Rosetti (C, Q)	4	3	0	1	9	7	+2	9	Qualification to promotion play-off	—	1–3	3–2
2	Victoria Buda	3	2	0	1	8	7	+1	6		2–4	—	
3	Viitorul Tisău	3	0	0	3	4	7	−3	0		0–1	2–3	—

Rules for classification: 1) Points; 2) Head-to-head points; 3) Head-to-head goal difference; 4) Head-to-head goals scored; 5) Head-to-head away goals scored; 6) Goal difference; 7) Goals scored.
(C) Champions; (Q) Qualified for the phase indicated

=== Călărași County ===
Series A

Pos	Team	Pld	W	D	L	GF	GA	GD	Pts	Qualification or relegation
1	Viitorul Sohatu (Q)	25	21	2	2	78	26	+52	65	Qualification to play-off semifinals
2	Curcani (Q)	26	17	2	7	75	42	+33	53	Qualification to play-off second round
3	Steaua Radovanu (Q)	25	15	4	6	72	30	+42	49	Qualification to play-off first round
4	Unirea Spanțov	26	15	3	8	65	57	+8	48	
5	Viitorul Plătărești	24	12	6	6	81	51	+30	42	
6	Budești	24	12	5	7	68	47	+21	41	
7	Unirea Podul Pitarului	24	11	6	7	53	46	+7	39	
8	Lumina Frumușani	25	9	4	12	53	59	−6	31	
9	Avântul Luica	25	10	0	15	66	76	−10	30	
10	Rapid Ulmeni	25	8	5	12	51	64	−13	29	
11	Viitorul Gălbinași	24	8	1	15	32	59	−27	25	
12	Viitorul Șoldanu	25	7	2	16	41	75	−34	23	
13	Partizanul Crivăț	24	5	2	17	42	87	−45	17	
14	Viitorul Mitreni	25	4	0	21	35	89	−54	12	

Rules for classification: 1) Points; 2) Head-to-head points; 3) Head-to-head goal difference; 4) Head-to-head goals scored; 5) Head-to-head away goals scored; 6) Goal difference; 7) Goals scored.
(Q) Qualified for the phase indicated

Series B

Pos	Team	Pld	W	D	L	GF	GA	GD	Pts	Qualification or relegation
1	Dâlga (Q)	22	19	2	1	88	18	+70	59	Qualification to play-off semifinals
2	Progresul Fundulea (Q)	22	14	6	2	75	23	+52	48	Qualification to play-off second round
3	Victoria Lehliu	22	13	1	8	45	34	+11	40	
4	Unirea Mănăstirea	22	11	4	7	49	28	+21	37	
5	Dinamo Sărulești	22	11	2	9	53	48	+5	35	
6	Avântul Dor Mărunt	22	8	5	9	39	41	−2	29	
7	Petrolul Ileana	22	8	3	11	29	37	−8	27	
8	Fortuna Tămădău	22	7	6	9	37	50	−13	27	
9	Speranța Plumbuita	22	8	1	13	39	59	−20	25	
10	Rapid Răzvani	22	5	3	14	31	68	−37	18	
11	Steaua Lupșanu	22	4	3	15	34	62	−28	15	
12	Atletic Dorobanțu	22	3	2	17	22	85	−63	11	

Rules for classification: 1) Points; 2) Head-to-head points; 3) Head-to-head goal difference; 4) Head-to-head goals scored; 5) Head-to-head away goals scored; 6) Goal difference; 7) Goals scored.
(Q) Qualified for the phase indicated

Series C

Pos	Team	Pld	W	D	L	GF	GA	GD	Pts	Qualification or relegation
1	Venus Independența	26	21	4	1	87	13	+74	67	Qualification to play-off semifinals
2	Dunărea Ciocănești	26	19	5	2	93	28	+65	62	Qualification to play-off second round
3	Șoimii Unirea	26	16	5	5	49	30	+19	53	Qualification to play-off first round
4	Spicul Roseți	26	15	5	6	69	38	+31	50	
5	Înainte Modelu	26	14	3	9	66	39	+27	45	
6	Unirea Dragalina	26	12	1	13	64	50	+14	37	
7	Zarea Cuza Vodă	26	10	4	12	44	51	−7	34	
8	Dunărea Grădiștea	26	10	4	12	38	46	−8	34	
9	Agricola Borcea	26	9	5	12	36	41	−5	32	
10	Avântul Pietroiu	26	8	4	14	36	51	−15	28	
11	Victoria Dragoș Vodă	26	7	5	14	34	51	−17	26	
12	Conpet Ștefan cel Mare	26	7	2	17	22	62	−40	23	
13	Victoria Potcoava	26	7	1	18	38	95	−57	22	
14	Tricolorul Jegălia	26	2	2	22	20	103	−83	8	

Rules for classification: 1) Points; 2) Head-to-head points; 3) Head-to-head goal difference; 4) Head-to-head goals scored; 5) Head-to-head away goals scored; 6) Goal difference; 7) Goals scored.

Championship play-off
First round

Team 1	Score	Team 2
Șoimii Unirea	1–0	Steaua Radovanu

Second round

Team 1	Score	Team 2
Progresul Fundulea	2–2 (5–4 p)	Șoimii Unirea
Dunărea Ciocănești	1–3	Curcani

Third round

Team 1	Score	Team 2
Progresul Fundulea	5–0	Curcani

Semifinals

Team 1	Agg.	Team 2	1st leg	2nd leg
Progresul Fundulea	5–1	Viitorul Sohatu	2–0	3–1
Viitorul Dâlga	1–4	Venus Independența	1–1	0–3

Final

The championship final was played on 4 June 2011 at Prefab Stadium in Modelu.

Team 1	Score	Team 2
Venus Independența	3–1	Progresul Fundulea

Venus Independența won the 2010–11 Liga IV Călărași County and qualify to promotion play-off in Liga III.

=== Caraș-Severin County ===
Pos	Team	Pld	W	D	L	GF	GA	GD	Pts	Qualification or relegation
1	Gloria Reșița (C, Q)	32	28	4	0	106	13	+93	88	Qualification to promotion play-off
2	Muncitorul Reșița	32	26	5	1	110	16	+94	83	
3	Voința Lupac	32	21	5	6	75	36	+39	68	
4	Bistra Glimboca	32	17	6	9	75	40	+35	57	
5	Moldo-Forest Moldova Nouă	32	15	6	11	75	59	+16	51	
6	Scorilo Autocatania Caransebeș II	32	15	5	12	57	46	+11	50	
7	Minerul Anina	32	14	7	11	53	43	+10	49	
8	Recolta Berzovia	32	14	5	13	50	52	−2	47	
9	Berzasca	32	12	4	16	68	70	−2	40	
10	Prolaz Karasevo	32	11	6	15	61	74	−13	39	
11	Nera Bozovici	32	10	7	15	56	71	−15	37	
12	Metalul Oțelu Roșu	32	11	2	19	59	74	−15	35	
13	Metalul Bocșa	32	10	5	17	40	52	−12	35	
14	Hercules Băile Herculane	32	10	5	17	42	74	−32	35	
15	Oravița	32	10	2	20	58	101	−43	32	
16	Viitorul Vermeș (R)	32	5	7	20	69	135	−66	22	Relegation to Liga V Caraș-Severin
17	CFR Era Club Caransebeș (R)	32	2	1	29	20	118	−98	7	Relegation to Liga V Caraș-Severin

Rules for classification: 1) Points; 2) Head-to-head points; 3) Head-to-head goal difference; 4) Head-to-head goals scored; 5) Head-to-head away goals scored; 6) Goal difference; 7) Goals scored.
(C) Champions; (Q) Qualified for the phase indicated; (R) Relegated

=== Cluj County ===
Pos	Team	Pld	W	D	L	GF	GA	GD	Pts	Qualification
1	Leii Tritenii de Jos	20	16	3	1	71	13	+58	51	Qualification to championship play-off
2	Vulturii Vultureni	20	15	3	2	47	22	+25	48	Qualification to championship play-off
3	Atletic Olimpia Gherla	20	15	1	4	61	17	+44	46	Qualification to championship play-off
4	Vlădeasa Huedin	20	15	0	5	74	25	+49	45	Qualification to championship play-off
5	Arieșul Mihai Viteazu	20	10	3	7	43	27	+16	33	Qualification to relegation play-out
6	Vulturul Mintiu-Gherlii	20	8	1	11	36	41	−5	25	Qualification to relegation play-out
7	Viitorul Gârbău-Sat	20	7	1	12	35	53	−18	22	Qualification to relegation play-out
8	Unirea Tritenii de Jos	20	4	4	12	33	61	−28	16	Qualification to relegation play-out
9	CFR Dej	20	3	3	14	17	67	−50	12	Qualification to relegation play-out
10	Someșul Gilău	20	3	3	14	14	46	−32	12	Qualification to relegation play-out
11	Prim-Diesel Cluj	20	2	2	16	32	91	−59	8	Qualification to relegation play-out

Rules for classification: 1) Points; 2) Head-to-head points; 3) Head-to-head goal difference; 4) Head-to-head goals scored; 5) Head-to-head away goals scored; 6) Goal difference; 7) Goals scored.

Championship play-off

Pos	Team	Pld	W	D	L	GF	GA	GD	Pts	Qualification
1	Leii Tritenii de Jos (C, Q)	26	21	3	2	94	18	+76	66	Qualification to promotion play-off
2	Vulturii Vultureni	26	19	3	4	58	34	+24	60	
3	Atletic Olimpia Gherla	26	17	1	8	68	26	+42	52	
4	Vlădeasa Huedin	26	16	0	10	76	42	+34	48	

Rules for classification: 1) Points; 2) Head-to-head points; 3) Head-to-head goal difference; 4) Head-to-head goals scored; 5) Head-to-head away goals scored; 6) Goal difference; 7) Goals scored.
(C) Champions; (Q) Qualified for the phase indicated

Relegation play-out

Pos	Team	Pld	W	D	L	GF	GA	GD	Pts	Relegation
5	Arieșul Mihai Viteazu	26	17	2	7	67	32	+35	53	
6	Vulturul Mintiu-Gherlii	26	13	1	12	61	49	+12	40	
7	Viitorul Gârbău-Sat	26	9	2	15	49	68	−19	29	
8	Unirea Tritenii de Jos	26	7	4	15	51	82	−31	25	
9	CFR Dej	26	5	3	18	23	80	−57	18	
10	Someșul Gilău	26	5	3	18	20	59	−39	18	
11	Prim-Diesel Cluj (R)	26	2	2	22	32	109	−77	8	Relegation to Liga V Cluj

Rules for classification: 1) Points; 2) Head-to-head points; 3) Head-to-head goal difference; 4) Head-to-head goals scored; 5) Head-to-head away goals scored; 6) Goal difference; 7) Goals scored.
(R) Relegated

=== Constanța County ===
East Series

Pos	Team	Pld	W	D	L	GF	GA	GD	Pts	Qualification
1	Internațional Pecineaga	22	17	3	2	75	21	+54	54	Qualification to championship play-off
2	Agigea	22	17	1	4	69	29	+40	52	Qualification to championship play-off
3	Gloria Albești	22	15	2	5	67	32	+35	47	Qualification to championship play-off
4	Eforie II	22	13	4	5	67	41	+26	43	Qualification to championship play-off
5	GSIB Mangalia	22	12	3	7	63	45	+18	39	Qualification to championship play-off
6	Portul Constanța	22	11	5	6	55	32	+23	38	Qualification to championship play-off
7	Sparta Techirghiol	22	6	5	11	39	59	−20	23	Qualification to championship play-out
8	Victoria Cumpăna	22	7	2	13	40	69	−29	23	Qualification to championship play-out
9	Ovidiu	22	6	2	14	51	62	−11	20	Qualification to championship play-out
10	Cogealac	22	5	2	15	39	54	−15	17	Qualification to championship play-out
11	Cariocas Constanța	22	3	5	14	28	56	−28	14	Qualification to championship play-out
12	Aurora 23 August	22	3	0	19	19	112	−93	9	Qualification to championship play-out

Rules for classification: 1) Points; 2) Head-to-head points; 3) Head-to-head goal difference; 4) Head-to-head goals scored; 5) Head-to-head away goals scored; 6) Goal difference; 7) Goals scored.

West Series

Pos	Team	Pld	W	D	L	GF	GA	GD	Pts	Qualification
1	Peștera	20	17	3	0	78	16	+62	54	Qualification to championship play-off
2	Carvăn Lipnița	20	12	3	5	41	26	+15	39	Qualification to championship play-off
3	Gloria Băneasa	20	11	2	7	60	41	+19	35	Qualification to championship play-off
4	Mihail Kogălniceanu	20	10	5	5	38	34	+4	35	Qualification to championship play-off
5	Cernavodă	20	9	6	5	24	24	0	33	Qualification to championship play-off
6	Dacia Mircea Vodă	20	9	4	7	38	33	+5	31	Qualification to championship play-off
7	Perla Murfatlar	20	8	4	8	42	40	+2	28	Qualification to championship play-out
8	Știința ACALAB Poarta Albă	20	6	3	11	33	37	−4	21	Qualification to championship play-out
9	Sport Prim Oltina	20	5	2	13	22	42	−20	17	Qualification to championship play-out
10	Danubius Rasova	20	3	2	15	17	55	−38	11 (Note: Danubius Rasova and Carsium Hârșova withdrew from the championship after 20 rounds and lost all the remaining matches with 0–3.)	Qualification to championship play-out
11	Carsium Hârșova	20	3	0	17	19	64	−45	9	Qualification to championship play-out

Rules for classification: 1) Points; 2) Head-to-head points; 3) Head-to-head goal difference; 4) Head-to-head goals scored; 5) Head-to-head away goals scored; 6) Goal difference; 7) Goals scored.
Notes:

Championship play-off

The teams from the West series started the play-off with all the records achieved in the regular season and the teams from East series started the play-off without the results against Aurora 23 August. The reason is the difference of matches played between the two series, 22 in the East and 20 in the West. The teams played only against the teams from the other series

Pos	Team	Pld	W	D	L	GF	GA	GD	Pts	Qualification
1	Peștera (C, Q)	32	27	4	1	115	28	+87	85	Qualification to promotion play-off
2	Agigea	32	23	2	7	88	50	+38	71	
3	Internațional Pecineaga	32	20	5	7	94	45	+49	65	
4	Gloria Albești	32	19	4	9	82	51	+31	61	
5	Gloria Băneasa	32	17	4	11	82	63	+19	55	
6	Eforie II	32	17	4	11	77	72	+5	55	
7	GSIB Mangalia	31	17	3	11	80	59	+21	54	
8	Portul Constanța	32	14	8	10	63	50	+13	50	
9	Mihail Kogălniceanu	32	15	5	12	67	68	−1	50	
10	Carvăn Lipnița	32	15	5	12	62	56	+6	50	
11	Cernavodă	32	10	8	14	37	55	−18	38	
12	Dacia Mircea Vodă	31	10	5	16	49	34	+15	35	

Rules for classification: 1) Points; 2) Head-to-head points; 3) Head-to-head goal difference; 4) Head-to-head goals scored; 5) Head-to-head away goals scored; 6) Goal difference; 7) Goals scored.
(C) Champions; (Q) Qualified for the phase indicated

Championship play-out

The teams started the play-out with all the records achieved in the regular season and played only against the teams from the other series.

Pos	Team	Pld	W	D	L	GF	GA	GD	Pts	Relegation
13	Perla Murfatlar	32	17	6	9	81	54	+27	57	
14	Sparta Techirghiol	32	14	5	13	69	74	−5	47	
15	Victoria Cumpăna	32	13	3	16	59	80	−21	42	
16	Ovidiu	32	12	5	15	85	84	+1	41	
17	Știința ACALAB Poarta Albă	32	11	4	17	66	75	−9	37	
18	Cogealac	32	11	2	19	63	68	−5	35	
19	Sport Prim Oltina	32	10	5	17	53	66	−13	35	
20	Cariocas Constanța	32	8	6	18	49	74	−25	30	
21	Aurora 23 August	32	7	1	24	39	135	−96	22	
22	Danubius Rasova (R)	32	3	2	27	17	91	−74	11 (Note: This ranking included 3–0 victories of the nine teams from the play-out in the matches against the teams withdrawn from the championship, respectively with Danubius Rasova and Carsium Hârșova.)	Relegation to Liga V Constanța
23	Carsium Hârșova (R)	32	3	0	29	19	100	−81	9	Relegation to Liga V Constanța

Rules for classification: 1) Points; 2) Head-to-head points; 3) Head-to-head goal difference; 4) Head-to-head goals scored; 5) Head-to-head away goals scored; 6) Goal difference; 7) Goals scored.
(R) Relegated

=== Covasna County ===
Pos	Team	Pld	W	D	L	GF	GA	GD	Pts	Qualification or relegation
1	Zagon (C, Q)	30	26	2	2	156	21	+135	80	Qualification to promotion play-off
2	Brețcu	30	20	4	6	72	27	+45	64	
3	Stăruința Bodoc	30	18	3	9	78	43	+35	57	
4	Ojdula	30	17	3	10	68	59	+9	54	
5	Păpăuți	30	16	3	11	75	55	+20	51	
6	Prima Brăduț	30	16	3	11	55	46	+9	51	
7	Nemere Ghelința	30	14	7	9	89	49	+40	49	
8	Victoria Ozun	30	12	5	13	54	46	+8	41	
9	BSE Belin	30	11	2	17	43	95	−52	35	
10	Baraolt	30	10	4	16	72	74	−2	34	
11	Ika Cernat	30	10	3	17	44	100	−56	33	
12	Avântul Ilieni	30	8	8	14	53	66	−13	32	
13	Perko Sânzieni	30	10	2	18	41	61	−20	32	
14	Progresul Sita Buzăului	30	10	2	18	49	98	−49	32	
15	Carpați Covasna (R)	30	10	2	18	46	82	−36	29 (Note: Carpați Covasna deducted 3 points.)	Relegation to Liga V Covasna
16	Dozsa Dalnic (R)	30	4	3	23	42	115	−73	15	Relegation to Liga V Covasna

Rules for classification: 1) Points; 2) Head-to-head points; 3) Head-to-head goal difference; 4) Head-to-head goals scored; 5) Head-to-head away goals scored; 6) Goal difference; 7) Goals scored.
(C) Champions; (Q) Qualified for the phase indicated; (R) Relegated

=== Dâmbovița County ===
Pos	Team	Pld	W	D	L	GF	GA	GD	Pts	Qualification or relegation
1	Atletic Fieni (C, Q)	34	31	2	1	127	32	+95	95	Qualification to promotion play-off
2	Gloria Cornești	34	31	0	3	145	29	+116	93	
3	Petrolul Tărgoviște	34	22	3	9	77	38	+39	69	
4	PAS Pucioasa	34	16	5	13	63	56	+7	53	
5	Recolta Gura Șuții	34	16	4	14	72	93	−21	52	
6	Voința Perșinari	34	14	5	15	76	74	+2	47	
7	Utchim Găești	34	17	7	10	77	44	+33	41 (Note: Utchim Găești deducted 17 points.)	
8	Gaz Metan Finta	34	12	5	17	73	98	−25	41	
9	Doicești	34	12	4	18	63	81	−18	40	
10	Flacăra Moreni	34	11	6	17	77	81	−4	39	
11	Comerțul Viișoara	34	10	9	15	51	70	−19	39	
12	Luceafărul Dărmănești	34	11	6	17	54	78	−24	39	
13	Conțești	34	11	5	18	69	75	−6	38	
14	Avântul Produlești	34	11	5	18	45	76	−31	38	
15	Bradul Moroieni	34	12	2	20	42	78	−36	38	
16	Răcari (Note: Răcari was spared from relegation due to the promotion of Atletic Fieni in Liga III.)	34	10	7	17	52	75	−23	37	Spared from relegation
17	Potlogi (R)	34	10	5	19	46	88	−42	35	Relegation to Liga V Dâmbovița
18	Colibași (R)	34	5	8	21	32	78	−46	23	Relegation to Liga V Dâmbovița

Rules for classification: 1) Points; 2) Head-to-head points; 3) Head-to-head goal difference; 4) Head-to-head goals scored; 5) Head-to-head away goals scored; 6) Goal difference; 7) Goals scored.
(C) Champions; (Q) Qualified for the phase indicated; (R) Relegated

=== Dolj County ===
Pos	Team	Pld	W	D	L	GF	GA	GD	Pts	Qualification or relegation
1	Sopot (Q)	29	24	5	0	104	17	+87	77	Qualification to play-off
2	Podari (Q)	29	21	6	2	81	19	+62	69	Qualification to play-off
3	Apă Craiova (Q)	29	20	2	7	68	29	+39	62	Qualification to play-off
4	Recolta Ostroveni (Q)	29	18	4	7	53	27	+26	58	Qualification to play-off
5	Progresul Segarcea	29	15	6	8	56	47	+9	51	
6	ȘF "Gică Popescu" Craiova	29	15	3	11	62	30	+32	48	
7	Ișalnița	29	14	5	10	74	42	+32	47	
8	Universitatea Craiova II	29	15	5	9	76	34	+42	50	
9	Energia Craiova	29	11	4	14	47	49	−2	37	
10	Viitorul Cârcea	29	10	7	12	54	66	−12	37	
11	Unirea Tricolor Dăbuleni	29	8	5	16	40	71	−31	29	
12	Avântul Pielești	29	7	6	16	43	59	−16	27	
13	Știința Malu Mare	29	7	2	20	27	86	−59	23	
14	Dunărea Bechet	29	6	2	21	38	111	−73	20	
15	Brădești	29	4	5	20	28	78	−50	17	
16	Progresul Băilești	29	2	3	24	26	113	−87	9	

Rules for classification: 1) Points; 2) Head-to-head points; 3) Head-to-head goal difference; 4) Head-to-head goals scored; 5) Head-to-head away goals scored; 6) Goal difference; 7) Goals scored.
(Q) Qualified for the phase indicated

Championship play-off

Pos	Team	Pld	W	D	L	GF	GA	GD	Pts	Qualification
1	Sopot (C, Q)	6	2	3	1	22	16	+6	23	Qualification for promotion play-off
2	Podari	6	2	2	2	16	13	+3	17	
3	Apă Craiova	6	2	3	1	11	12	−1	13	
4	Recolta Ostroveni	6	0	4	2	10	18	−8	10	

Rules for classification: 1) Points; 2) Head-to-head points; 3) Head-to-head goal difference; 4) Head-to-head goals scored; 5) Head-to-head away goals scored; 6) Goal difference; 7) Goals scored.
(C) Champions; (Q) Qualified for the phase indicated

=== Galați County ===
Pos	Team	Pld	W	D	L	GF	GA	GD	Pts	Qualification or relegation
1	Metalul Toflea (C, Q)	26	21	2	3	67	24	+43	65	Qualification to promotion play-off
2	Avântul Vânatori	26	21	1	4	89	38	+51	64	
3	Frontiera Galați	26	17	2	7	74	32	+42	53	
4	Muncitorul Ghidigeni	26	17	2	7	76	36	+40	53	
5	Foresta Șendreni	26	14	4	8	51	41	+10	46	
6	Fulgerul Smulți	26	12	2	12	73	60	+13	38	
7	CSȘ Tecuci	26	11	4	11	58	47	+11	37	
8	Unirea Braniștea	26	10	6	10	52	56	−4	36	
9	Gloria Ivești	26	9	4	13	52	74	−22	31	
10	Bujorii Târgu Bujor	26	9	3	14	47	52	−5	30	
11	Unirea Hanu Conachi	26	7	2	17	46	73	−27	23	
12	Voința Șivița	26	5	4	17	38	74	−36	19	
13	Victoria Independența	26	5	2	19	32	76	−44	17	
14	Sporting Liești	26	5	0	21	32	104	−72	15	

Rules for classification: 1) Points; 2) Head-to-head points; 3) Head-to-head goal difference; 4) Head-to-head goals scored; 5) Head-to-head away goals scored; 6) Goal difference; 7) Goals scored.
(C) Champions; (Q) Qualified for the phase indicated

=== Giurgiu County ===
Pos	Team	Pld	W	D	L	GF	GA	GD	Pts	Qualification or relegation
1	Rapid Clejani (Q)	36	35	1	0	193	24	+169	106	Qualification to championship play-off
2	Bolintin Malu Spart (Q)	36	29	2	5	131	53	+78	89	Qualification to championship play-off
3	Nova Force Giurgiu (Q)	36	22	6	8	134	55	+79	72	Qualification to championship play-off
4	Victoria Adunații Copăceni (Q)	36	25	3	8	131	57	+74	71 (Note: Victoria Adunații Copăceni deducted 7 points.)	Qualification to championship play-off
5	Avântul Florești	36	20	5	11	93	77	+16	65	
6	Crevedia Mare	36	18	4	14	89	87	+2	58	
7	Scărișoara	36	14	9	13	84	79	+5	51	
8	Prundu	36	16	3	17	85	94	−9	51	
9	Voința Slobozia	36	14	5	17	100	117	−17	47	
10	Constructorul Malu Spart	36	12	5	19	67	103	−36	41	
11	Zmeii Ogrezeni	36	11	5	20	73	98	−25	38	
12	Constructorul Bolintin-Deal	36	12	2	22	69	127	−58	38	
13	Dragonii Ogrezeni	36	14	2	20	74	101	−27	38 (Note: Zmeii Ogrezeni deducted 6 points.)	
14	Silver Inter Zorile	36	9	11	16	61	94	−33	38	
15	Dunărea Oinacu	36	11	4	21	57	103	−46	37	
16	Viitorul Vedea	36	10	5	21	65	97	−32	35	
17	Unirea Vânători	36	7	4	25	62	122	−60	25	
18	Singureni	36	13	2	21	59	85	−26	41 (Note: Singureni withdrew in the second part of the season and lost all remaining matches with 0–3.)	
19	Unirea Ghimpați	36	9	2	25	45	92	−47	29	
20	Unirea Izvoarele (D)	0	0	0	0	0	0	0	0 (Note: Unirea Izvoarele and Gloria Comana withdrew in the first part of the season and all their results were canceled.)	Withdrew
21	Gloria Comana (D)	0	0	0	0	0	0	0	0	Withdrew
22	Naipu (E)	0	0	0	0	0	0	0	0 (Note: Naipu excluded in the first part of the season and all its results were canceled.)	Excluded

Rules for classification: 1) Points; 2) Head-to-head points; 3) Head-to-head goal difference; 4) Head-to-head goals scored; 5) Head-to-head away goals scored; 6) Goal difference; 7) Goals scored.
(D) Disqualified; (E) Eliminated; (Q) Qualified for the phase indicated
Notes:

Championship play-off

The championship play-off played between the best four ranked team in the regular season. All matches were played at Dunărea-Port Stadium on 4 and 5 June (semi-finals) and 9 June 2011 (final).

Semi-finals

Team 1	Score	Team 2
Bolintin Malu Spart	3–1	Victoria Adunații Copăceni
Rapid Clejani	7–0	Nova Force Giurgiu

Final

Team 1	Score	Team 2
Rapid Clejani	4–2	Bolintin Malu Spart

Rapid Clejani won the 2010–11 Liga IV Giurgiu County and qualify to promotion play-off in Liga III.

=== Gorj County ===
Pos	Team	Pld	W	D	L	GF	GA	GD	Pts	Qualification or relegation
1	Ralbex Turcinești (C, Q)	30	26	1	3	135	38	+97	79	Qualification to promotion play-off
2	Știința Turceni	30	23	3	4	87	29	+58	72	
3	Știința Peștișani	30	20	4	6	70	34	+36	64	
4	Unirea Crușeț	30	19	2	9	78	42	+36	59	
5	Dinamo Stănești	30	19	2	9	58	30	+28	59	
6	Energetica Tismana	30	16	5	9	63	47	+16	53	
7	Petrolul Țicleni	30	16	4	10	71	39	+32	52	
8	Știința Ceplea	30	12	4	14	65	67	−2	40	
9	Minerul Mătăsari II	30	11	5	14	52	58	−6	38	
10	Flacăra Roșia de Amaradia	30	10	2	18	47	80	−33	32	
11	Internațional Bălești	30	8	6	16	46	78	−32	30	
12	Parângul Sadu	30	7	8	15	48	83	−35	29	
13	Viitorul Negomir	30	7	7	16	58	70	−12	28	
14	Dumbrava Câlnic	30	4	6	20	44	96	−52	18	
15	Vulturii Fărcășești (R)	30	5	3	22	44	114	−70	18	Relegation to Liga V Gorj
16	Petrolul Stoina (R)	30	5	2	23	30	91	−61	17	Relegation to Liga V Gorj

Rules for classification: 1) Points; 2) Head-to-head points; 3) Head-to-head goal difference; 4) Head-to-head goals scored; 5) Head-to-head away goals scored; 6) Goal difference; 7) Goals scored.
(C) Champions; (Q) Qualified for the phase indicated; (R) Relegated

=== Harghita County ===
Pos	Team	Pld	W	D	L	GF	GA	GD	Pts	Qualification or relegation
1	ASA Miercurea Ciuc Bălan (C, Q)	22	18	2	2	79	23	+56	56	Qualification to promotion play-off
2	Miercurea Ciuc	22	15	4	3	74	17	+57	49	
3	Metalul Vlăhița	22	14	6	2	60	27	+33	48	
4	Străduința Mihăileni	22	13	3	6	45	35	+10	42	
5	Ciceu	22	11	5	6	50	34	+16	38	
6	Viitorul Gheorgheni	22	10	4	8	48	41	+7	34	
7	Odorheiu Secuiesc II	22	7	3	12	30	44	−14	24	
8	Unirea Cristuru Secuiesc	22	7	0	15	32	52	−20	21	
9	Lunca de Sus	22	7	0	15	40	63	−23	21	
10	Praid	22	5	4	13	24	53	−29	19	
11	Roseal Odorheiu Secuiesc (R)	22	5	3	14	28	61	−33	18	Relegation to Liga V Harghita
12	Homorod Merești (R)	22	3	0	19	27	87	−60	9	Relegation to Liga V Harghita

Rules for classification: 1) Points; 2) Head-to-head points; 3) Head-to-head goal difference; 4) Head-to-head goals scored; 5) Head-to-head away goals scored; 6) Goal difference; 7) Goals scored.
(C) Champions; (Q) Qualified for the phase indicated; (R) Relegated

=== Hunedoara County ===
Pos	Team	Pld	W	D	L	GF	GA	GD	Pts	Qualification or relegation
1	Jiul Petroșani (C, Q)	30	25	4	1	122	14	+108	79	Qualification to promotion play-off
2	Minerul Uricani	30	23	5	2	85	20	+65	74	
3	Universitatea Petroșani	30	20	4	6	80	33	+47	64	
4	Aurul Brad	30	18	6	6	71	31	+40	60	
5	Vulcan	30	13	8	9	52	33	+19	47	
6	Aurul Certej	30	15	3	12	76	65	+11	45 (Note: Aurul Certej deducted 3 points.)	
7	Hunedoara II	30	12	4	14	67	66	+1	40	
8	Minerul Aninoasa	30	11	6	13	42	39	+3	39	
9	Zarandul Crișcior	30	11	6	13	42	68	−26	39	
10	Dacicus Orăștie	30	10	5	15	60	79	−19	35	
11	Inter Petrila	30	10	3	17	42	80	−38	33	
12	Gloria Geoagiu	30	9	3	18	37	73	−36	30	
13	Retezatul Hațeg	30	12	2	16	58	55	+3	20 (Note: Retezatul Hațeg deducted 18 points.)	
14	Metalul Crișcior	30	5	5	20	30	70	−40	20	
15	Cetate Deva	30	4	6	20	34	105	−71	18	
16	Victoria Călan	30	6	2	22	35	102	−67	17 (Note: Victoria Călan deducted 3 points.)	

Rules for classification: 1) Points; 2) Head-to-head points; 3) Head-to-head goal difference; 4) Head-to-head goals scored; 5) Head-to-head away goals scored; 6) Goal difference; 7) Goals scored.
(C) Champions; (Q) Qualified for the phase indicated

=== Ialomița County ===
Pos	Team	Pld	W	D	L	GF	GA	GD	Pts	Qualification or relegation
1	Viitorul Axintele (C, Q)	30	26	3	1	126	13	+113	81	Qualification to promotion play-off
2	Victoria Amara	30	19	9	2	87	36	+51	66	
3	Abatorul Slobozia	30	21	3	6	98	54	+44	66	
4	Recolta Gheorghe Lazăr	30	17	7	6	112	45	+67	58	
5	Olimpia Brazii	30	15	5	10	81	59	+22	50	
6	Rapid Fetești	30	15	4	11	77	43	+34	49	
7	Victoria Țăndărei	30	14	6	10	83	42	+41	48	
8	Andrias Andrășești	30	13	4	13	65	57	+8	43	
9	Voința Reviga	30	12	7	11	83	81	+2	42 (Note: Voința Reviga deducted 1 point.)	
10	Recolta Gheorghe Doja	30	11	7	12	68	119	−51	40	
11	Viticola Fetești	30	10	4	16	58	82	−24	34	
12	Juventus Borănești	30	10	4	16	82	107	−25	34	
13	Victoria Munteni-Buzău (R)	30	9	7	14	40	66	−26	34	Relegation to Liga V Ialomița
14	Libertatea Sălcioara (R)	30	5	1	24	32	106	−74	13 (Note: Libertatea Sălcioara deducted 3 points.)	Relegation to Liga V Ialomița
15	Bărăganul Ciulnița (R)	30	4	1	25	28	121	−93	13	Relegation to Liga V Ialomița
16	Recolta Bărcănești (R)	30	2	2	26	34	124	−90	8	Relegation to Liga V Ialomița

Rules for classification: 1) Points; 2) Head-to-head points; 3) Head-to-head goal difference; 4) Head-to-head goals scored; 5) Head-to-head away goals scored; 6) Goal difference; 7) Goals scored.
(C) Champions; (Q) Qualified for the phase indicated; (R) Relegated

=== Iași County ===
Pos	Team	Pld	W	D	L	GF	GA	GD	Pts	Qualification or relegation
1	Rapid Dumești (C, Q)	32	28	2	2	131	28	+103	86	Qualification to promotion play-off
2	Știința Miroslava	32	23	6	3	89	28	+61	75	
3	Stejarul Sinești	32	20	1	11	84	51	+33	61	
4	Viitorul Târgu Frumos	32	17	4	11	83	61	+22	55	
5	Politehnica Iași II	32	16	5	11	92	57	+35	53	
6	Astra Răducăneni	32	15	7	10	84	67	+17	52	
7	Viitorul Lungani	32	15	6	11	53	62	−9	51	
8	Unirea Ruginoasa	32	15	3	14	63	64	−1	48	
9	Viitorul Hârlău	32	13	4	15	67	63	+4	43	
10	Unirea Mircești	32	14	0	18	50	70	−20	42	
11	Biruința Miroslovești	32	11	8	13	58	60	−2	41	
12	Gloria Bălțați	32	11	7	14	41	69	−28	40	
13	Viitorul Belcești	32	11	4	17	72	101	−29	37	
14	Foresta Ciurea	32	11	3	18	45	61	−16	36	
15	Magna Holboca (R)	32	11	3	18	60	92	−32	36	Relegation to Liga V Iași
16	Helios Tomești (R)	32	5	1	26	41	116	−75	16	Relegation to Liga V Iași
17	Voința Voinești (R)	32	2	4	26	41	104	−63	10	Relegation to Liga V Iași

Rules for classification: 1) Points; 2) Head-to-head points; 3) Head-to-head goal difference; 4) Head-to-head goals scored; 5) Head-to-head away goals scored; 6) Goal difference; 7) Goals scored.
(C) Champions; (Q) Qualified for the phase indicated; (R) Relegated

=== Ilfov County ===
Pos	Team	Pld	W	D	L	GF	GA	GD	Pts	Qualification or relegation
1	Afumați (Q)	30	29	0	1	202	10	+192	87	Qualification to championship play-off
2	Lindab Ștefănești (Q)	30	28	1	1	182	21	+161	85	Qualification to championship play-off
3	Corbeanca (Q)	30	24	0	6	90	20	+70	72	Qualification to championship play-off
4	Viitorul Dragomirești (Q)	30	20	4	6	88	54	+34	64	Qualification to championship play-off
5	Glina	30	16	3	11	61	94	−33	51	
6	Codrii Vlăsiei Moara Vlăsiei	30	13	5	12	60	75	−15	44	
7	Voința Periș	30	13	4	13	60	58	+2	43	
8	Balotești II	30	13	3	14	64	64	0	42	
9	Sinești	30	13	3	14	75	71	+4	42	
10	Bragadiru	30	11	2	17	53	78	−25	35	
11	Pescărușul Grădiștea	30	10	1	19	45	79	−34	31	
12	Inter Voluntari	30	9	1	20	31	98	−67	28	
13	Măgurele	30	8	3	19	49	91	−42	27	
14	Olimpia Ciolpani	30	8	1	21	34	100	−66	25	
15	Gloria Islaz	30	6	0	24	24	120	−96	18	
16	Victoria Tânganu	30	3	1	26	15	100	−85	10	

Rules for classification: 1) Points; 2) Head-to-head points; 3) Head-to-head goal difference; 4) Head-to-head goals scored; 5) Head-to-head away goals scored; 6) Goal difference; 7) Goals scored.
(Q) Qualified for the phase indicated

Championship play-off

Championship play-off played in a single round-robin tournament between the best four teams of the regular season. The teams started the play-off with the following points: 1st place – 3 points, 2nd place – 2 points, 3rd place – 1 point, 4th place – 0 points.

Pos	Team	Pld	W	D	L	GF	GA	GD	Pts	Qualification
1	Lindab Ștefănești (C, Q)	3	2	1	0	9	1	+8	9	Qualification for promotion play-off
2	Afumați	3	2	0	1	5	3	+2	9	
3	Corbeanca	3	1	1	1	6	4	+2	5	
4	Viitorul Dragomirești	3	0	0	3	1	13	−12	0	

Rules for classification: 1) Points; 2) Head-to-head points; 3) Head-to-head goal difference; 4) Head-to-head goals scored; 5) Head-to-head away goals scored; 6) Goal difference; 7) Goals scored.
(C) Champions; (Q) Qualified for the phase indicated

=== Maramureș County ===
North Series

Pos	Team	Pld	W	D	L	GF	GA	GD	Pts	Qualification or relegation
1	Marmația Sighetu Marmației (Q)	24	22	1	1	112	25	+87	64 (Note: Marmația Sighetu Marmației deducted 3 points because of not reaching the minimum margin in the previous Liga III season.)	Qualification to championship final
2	Zorile Moisei	24	19	2	3	97	33	+64	59	
3	Plimob Sighetu Marmației	24	17	3	4	96	29	+67	54	
4	Rozalina Rozavlea	24	17	3	4	90	30	+60	54	
5	Borșa	24	13	3	8	89	51	+38	42	
6	Iza Dragomirești	23	10	3	10	66	52	+14	33	
7	Foresta Câmpulung la Tisa	24	10	2	12	46	66	−20	32	
8	Salina Ocna Șugatag	23	7	3	13	52	90	−38	24	
9	Brișca Sarasău	24	6	2	16	42	76	−34	20	
10	Luceafărul Strâmtura	24	5	5	14	29	75	−46	20	
11	Recolta Săliștea de Sus	24	4	5	15	45	103	−58	17	
12	Avântul Bârsana	24	2	7	15	37	75	−38	13	
13	Bradul Vișeu de Sus	24	2	3	19	35	129	−94	9	

Rules for classification: 1) Points; 2) Head-to-head points; 3) Head-to-head goal difference; 4) Head-to-head goals scored; 5) Head-to-head away goals scored; 6) Goal difference; 7) Goals scored.
(Q) Qualified for the phase indicated
Notes:

South Series

Pos	Team	Pld	W	D	L	GF	GA	GD	Pts	Qualification or relegation
1	Progresul Șomcuta Mare (Q)	24	19	2	3	67	27	+40	59	Qualification to championship final
2	Spicul Mocira	24	18	2	4	84	29	+55	56	
3	Spicul Ardusat	24	17	3	4	67	35	+32	54	
4	Eaton Fărcașa	24	13	2	9	75	36	+39	41	
5	Unirea Șișești	24	12	5	7	47	40	+7	41	
6	Maramureș Universitar Baia Mare II	24	12	4	8	58	38	+20	40	
7	Lăpușul Târgu Lăpuș	24	12	3	9	62	48	+14	39	
8	Seini	24	8	4	12	43	40	+3	28	
9	Vectrix Satulung	24	7	6	11	42	58	−16	27	
10	Asten Tăuții-Măgherăuș	24	7	5	12	38	52	−14	26	
11	Minerul Cavnic	24	6	5	13	32	57	−25	23	
12	Gloria Renel Baia Mare	24	3	3	18	25	93	−68	12	
13	Minerul Băița	24	0	0	24	14	97	−83	0	

Rules for classification: 1) Points; 2) Head-to-head points; 3) Head-to-head goal difference; 4) Head-to-head goals scored; 5) Head-to-head away goals scored; 6) Goal difference; 7) Goals scored.
(Q) Qualified for the phase indicated

Championship final

Team 1	Score	Team 2
Progresul Șomcuta Mare	2–3	Marmația Sighetu Marmației

Marmația Sighetu Marmației won the 2010–11 Liga IV Maramureș County and qualify to promotion play-off in Liga III.

=== Mehedinți County ===
Pos	Team	Pld	W	D	L	GF	GA	GD	Pts	Qualification or relegation
1	Dunărea Pristol (C, Q)	24	22	1	1	100	20	+80	67	Qualification to promotion play-off
2	Minerul Valea Copcii	24	20	1	3	95	14	+81	61	
3	Blahnița Pătulele	24	16	3	5	98	43	+55	51	
4	Recolta Dănceu	23	14	4	5	99	43	+56	46	
5	Dunărea Gruia	24	12	2	10	46	48	−2	38	
6	Phoenix Drobeta-Turnu-Severin	24	10	6	8	44	35	+9	36	
7	Pandurii Cerneți	24	11	2	11	66	42	+24	35	
8	Strehaia	24	10	4	10	59	41	+18	34	
9	Viitorul Cujmir	23	9	2	12	47	58	−11	29	
10	Agromec Șimian	24	6	2	16	27	69	−42	20	
11	Constructorul Eșelnița	24	5	0	19	30	86	−56	15	
12	Corcova	24	5	0	19	37	119	−82	15	
13	Victoria Devesel	24	1	1	22	18	148	−130	4	

Rules for classification: 1) Points; 2) Head-to-head points; 3) Head-to-head goal difference; 4) Head-to-head goals scored; 5) Head-to-head away goals scored; 6) Goal difference; 7) Goals scored.
(C) Champions; (Q) Qualified for the phase indicated

=== Mureș County ===
Pos	Team	Pld	W	D	L	GF	GA	GD	Pts	Qualification or relegation
1	FCM Târgu Mureș II (C, Q)	24	18	4	2	75	16	+59	58	Qualification to promotion play-off
2	Gaz Metan Târgu Mureș	24	18	3	3	74	28	+46	57	
3	Mureșul Rușii-Munți	24	15	3	6	65	35	+30	48	
4	Mureșul Luduș	24	14	5	5	66	29	+37	47	
5	Lacul Ursu Mobila Sovata	24	13	4	7	52	36	+16	43	
6	Miercurea Nirajului	24	12	4	8	71	37	+34	40	
7	Iernut	24	12	3	9	61	33	+28	39	
8	Avântul Miheșu de Câmpie	24	10	2	12	54	71	−17	32	
9	MSE 08 Târgu Mureș	24	9	4	11	47	46	+1	31	
10	Gaz Metan Daneș	24	8	2	14	54	77	−23	26	
11	Sărmașu	24	3	4	17	36	76	−40	13	
12	Gornești	24	3	2	19	31	99	−68	11	
13	Târnava Mică Sângeorgiu de Pădure	24	1	0	23	12	114	−102	3	

Rules for classification: 1) Points; 2) Head-to-head points; 3) Head-to-head goal difference; 4) Head-to-head goals scored; 5) Head-to-head away goals scored; 6) Goal difference; 7) Goals scored.
(C) Champions; (Q) Qualified for the phase indicated

=== Neamț County ===
Pos	Team	Pld	W	D	L	GF	GA	GD	Pts	Qualification or relegation
1	Energia Girov (C, Q)	32	32	0	0	170	21	+149	96	Qualification to promotion play-off
2	Bradul Roznov	32	23	2	7	125	35	+90	71	
3	Voința Ion Creangă	32	20	5	7	122	46	+76	65	
4	Energia Pângărați	32	19	7	6	95	46	+49	64	
5	Speranța Răucești	32	20	4	8	83	50	+33	64	
6	Spicul Tămășeni	32	19	4	9	100	46	+54	61	
7	Biruința Gherăești	32	18	3	11	74	50	+24	57	
8	Teiul Poiana Teiului	32	14	3	15	78	79	−1	45	
9	Ozana Timișești	32	15	0	17	71	92	−21	45	
10	Victoria Horia	32	13	5	14	84	88	−4	44	
11	Viitorul Podoleni	32	12	2	18	59	89	−30	38	
12	Siretul Adjudeni	32	10	6	16	76	109	−33	36	
13	Zimbrul Vânători-Neamț	32	11	1	20	69	112	−43	34	
14	Avântul Petricani	32	8	3	21	48	113	−65	27	
15	Moldova Cordun	32	5	4	23	44	138	−94	19	
16	Moldova Drăgănești (R)	32	5	1	26	31	111	−80	16 (Note: Moldova Drăgănești withdrew in the second half of the season and lost all the remaining matches with 0–3.)	Relegation to Liga V Neamț
17	LPS Roman (R)	32	2	2	28	29	133	−104	8	Relegation to Liga V Neamț

Rules for classification: 1) Points; 2) Head-to-head points; 3) Head-to-head goal difference; 4) Head-to-head goals scored; 5) Head-to-head away goals scored; 6) Goal difference; 7) Goals scored.
(C) Champions; (Q) Qualified for the phase indicated; (R) Relegated

=== Olt County ===
Pos	Team	Pld	W	D	L	GF	GA	GD	Pts	Qualification or relegation
1	Recolta Stoicănești (C, Q)	30	24	6	0	96	24	+72	78	Qualification to promotion play-off
2	Viitorul Grădinile	30	20	6	4	91	39	+52	66	
3	Petrolul Potcoava	30	20	5	5	63	24	+39	65	
4	CSM Slatina II	30	19	3	8	97	43	+54	60	
5	Gloria Vișina	30	17	3	10	56	41	+15	54	
6	Olimpia Rotunda	30	15	7	8	76	48	+28	52	
7	Balș	30	15	3	12	68	63	+5	48	
8	Vedea Văleni	30	15	3	12	56	65	−9	48	
9	Unirea Turia	30	13	7	10	68	49	+19	46	
10	Olt Scornicești	30	11	5	14	62	51	+11	38	
11	Sporting Balș	30	10	2	18	42	83	−41	32	
12	Gloria Deveselu	30	8	3	19	50	85	−35	27	
13	Viitorul Rusănești	30	7	4	19	55	87	−32	25	
14	Progresul Corabia II	30	7	1	22	31	77	−46	22	
15	Recolta Urzica	30	4	3	23	29	94	−65	15	
16	Unirea Pârșcoveni	30	2	3	25	13	86	−73	9	

Rules for classification: 1) Points; 2) Head-to-head points; 3) Head-to-head goal difference; 4) Head-to-head goals scored; 5) Head-to-head away goals scored; 6) Goal difference; 7) Goals scored.
(C) Champions; (Q) Qualified for the phase indicated

=== Prahova County ===
Pos	Team	Pld	W	D	L	GF	GA	GD	Pts	Qualification or relegation
1	Prahova 2010 Tomșani (C, Q)	34	30	2	2	109	25	+84	92	Qualification to promotion play-off
2	Ceptura	34	26	5	3	90	22	+68	83	
3	Avântul Măneciu	34	24	4	6	89	34	+55	76	
4	Bănești Urleta	34	17	4	13	73	48	+25	55	
5	Brebu	34	16	6	12	63	50	+13	54	
6	Păulești	34	16	6	12	61	49	+12	54	
7	Petrolul Ploiești II	34	15	6	13	65	43	+22	51	
8	Podgoria Vadu Săpat	34	14	7	13	88	66	+22	49	
9	Dero Ploiești	34	15	3	16	79	69	+10	48	
10	Unirea Câmpina	34	13	9	12	52	45	+7	48	
11	Tricolorul Breaza II	34	13	8	13	52	69	−17	47	
12	Caraimanul Bușteni	34	14	3	17	52	56	−4	45	
13	Tinerețea Izvoarele	34	13	3	18	67	83	−16	42	
14	Carpați Sinaia	34	12	6	16	36	48	−12	42	
15	Unirea Urlați (Note: Unirea Urlați was spared from relegation due to the promotion of Prahova 2010 Tomșani to Liga III.)	34	10	7	17	53	77	−24	37	Spared from relegation
16	Șirna (R)	34	6	8	20	53	100	−47	26	Relegation to Liga V Prahova
17	Petrolul Teleajen Ploiești (R)	34	5	3	26	43	84	−41	16 (Note: Petrolul Teleajen Ploiești deducted 2 points.)	Relegation to Liga V Prahova
18	Florești (R)	34	0	2	32	26	189	−163	2	Relegation to Liga V Prahova

Rules for classification: 1) Points; 2) Head-to-head points; 3) Head-to-head goal difference; 4) Head-to-head goals scored; 5) Head-to-head away goals scored; 6) Goal difference; 7) Goals scored.
(C) Champions; (Q) Qualified for the phase indicated; (R) Relegated

=== Satu Mare County ===
Series A

Pos	Team	Pld	W	D	L	GF	GA	GD	Pts	Qualification or relegation
1	Olimpia Satu Mare (Q)	30	29	1	0	109	16	+93	88	Qualification to championship final
2	Energia Negrești-Oaș	29	22	3	4	78	34	+44	69	
3	Recolta Dorolț	29	20	2	7	78	27	+51	62	
4	Dacia Medieșu Aurit	30	19	2	9	95	50	+45	59	
5	Talna Orașu Nou	30	18	3	9	93	35	+58	57	
6	Gama Best Satu Mare	29	14	4	11	73	52	+21	46	
7	Livada	30	12	6	12	60	62	−2	42	
8	Someșul Odoreu	29	12	2	15	64	67	−3	38	
9	Turul Micula	30	15	2	13	76	62	+14	37 (Note: Turul Micula deducted 10 points.)	
10	Someșul Cărășeu	30	10	5	15	56	53	+3	35	
11	Voința Doba	30	10	4	16	53	71	−18	34	
12	Unirea Păulești	29	9	2	18	52	89	−37	29	
13	Voința Lazuri	30	7	4	19	53	91	−38	25	
14	Sportul Botiz	29	7	4	18	37	80	−43	25	
15	Minerul Turț	29	6	1	22	37	118	−81	19	
16	Forestiera Bixad (R)	29	2	3	24	30	137	−107	9	Relegation to Liga V Satu Mare

Rules for classification: 1) Points; 2) Head-to-head points; 3) Head-to-head goal difference; 4) Head-to-head goals scored; 5) Head-to-head away goals scored; 6) Goal difference; 7) Goals scored.
(Q) Qualified for the phase indicated; (R) Relegated
Notes:

Series B

Pos	Team	Pld	W	D	L	GF	GA	GD	Pts	Qualification or relegation
1	Someșul Oar (Q)	30	25	5	0	113	24	+89	80	Qualification to championship final
2	Unirea Tășnad	30	19	4	7	73	45	+28	61	
3	Victoria Carei	30	18	3	9	60	29	+31	57	
4	Viitorul Vetiș	30	18	3	9	66	49	+17	57	
5	Fortuna Căpleni	30	15	8	7	52	27	+25	53	
6	Schwaben Cămin	30	17	2	11	62	38	+24	53	
7	Frohlich Foieni	30	14	8	8	46	39	+7	50	
8	Olimpia Căuaș	30	13	4	13	66	52	+14	43	
9	Stăruința Berveni	30	13	4	13	55	63	−8	43	
10	Real Andrid	30	11	3	16	46	51	−5	36	
11	Unirea Pișcolt	30	10	2	18	32	57	−25	32	
12	Recolta Sanislău	30	8	5	17	34	71	−37	29	
13	Victoria Petrești	30	7	3	20	41	72	−31	24	
14	Kneho Urziceni	30	6	6	18	29	65	−36	24	
15	Luceafărul Decebal	29	7	2	20	27	80	−53	23	
16	Voința Babța (R)	29	6	2	21	48	88	−40	20	Relegation to Liga V Satu Mare

Rules for classification: 1) Points; 2) Head-to-head points; 3) Head-to-head goal difference; 4) Head-to-head goals scored; 5) Head-to-head away goals scored; 6) Goal difference; 7) Goals scored.
(Q) Qualified for the phase indicated; (R) Relegated

Championship final

The championship final was played on 5 June 2011 at Olimpia Stadium in Satu Mare.

Team 1	Score	Team 2
Olimpia Satu Mare	4–0	Someșul Oar

Olimpia Satu Mare won the 2010–11 Liga IV Satu Mare County and qualify to promotion play-off in Liga III.

=== Sălaj County ===
Pos	Team	Pld	W	D	L	GF	GA	GD	Pts	Qualification or relegation
1	Meseșul Treznea (C, Q)	22	17	1	4	69	29	+40	52	Qualification to promotion play-off
2	Dumbrava Gâlgău Almașului	22	15	5	2	72	31	+41	50	
3	Flacăra Halmășd	22	15	1	6	72	47	+25	46	
4	Rapid Jibou	22	11	5	6	63	61	+2	38	
5	Barcău Nușfalău	22	10	6	6	70	36	+34	36	
6	Venus Măeriște	22	10	3	9	59	64	−5	33	
7	Gloria Bobota	21	9	3	9	52	52	0	30	
8	Inter Cizer	22	7	7	8	35	37	−2	28	
9	Someșul Someș-Odorhei	22	5	4	13	51	87	−36	19	
10	Silvania Cehu Silvaniei	22	4	2	16	42	75	−33	14	
11	Chieșd	22	4	2	16	41	89	−48	14	
12	Benfica Ileanda	21	2	5	14	32	62	−30	11	

Rules for classification: 1) Points; 2) Head-to-head points; 3) Head-to-head goal difference; 4) Head-to-head goals scored; 5) Head-to-head away goals scored; 6) Goal difference; 7) Goals scored.
(C) Champions; (Q) Qualified for the phase indicated

=== Sibiu County ===
Pos	Team	Pld	W	D	L	GF	GA	GD	Pts	Qualification or relegation
1	Sevișul Șelimbăr (C, Q)	20	18	1	1	69	8	+61	55	Qualification to promotion play-off
2	Sparta Mediaș	20	15	2	3	60	22	+38	47	
3	Voința Sibiu II	20	14	2	4	52	22	+30	44	
4	Agnita	20	11	2	7	39	24	+15	35	
5	Amicii Copșa Mică	20	9	2	9	25	32	−7	29	
6	Avrig	20	8	4	8	38	28	+10	28	
7	Tălmaciu	20	7	3	10	22	33	−11	24	
8	Cisnădie II	20	6	4	10	22	40	−18	22	
9	Unirea Ocna Sibiului	20	5	6	9	26	56	−30	21	
10	ASA Sibiu	20	3	2	15	22	58	−36	11	
11	Mihăiță Stănescu (D)	20	0	2	18	7	59	−52	2 (Note: Mihăiță Stănescu withdrew at the end of the first part of the season and lost all remaining matches with 0–3.)	Withdrew

Rules for classification: 1) Points; 2) Head-to-head points; 3) Head-to-head goal difference; 4) Head-to-head goals scored; 5) Head-to-head away goals scored; 6) Goal difference; 7) Goals scored.
(C) Champions; (D) Disqualified; (Q) Qualified for the phase indicated

=== Suceava County ===
Pos	Team	Pld	W	D	L	GF	GA	GD	Pts	Qualification or relegation
1	Sporting Suceava (C, Q)	32	24	6	2	103	30	+73	78	Qualification to promotion play-off
2	Foresta Mălini	32	22	3	7	101	38	+63	69	
3	Foresta Moldovița	32	21	5	6	81	36	+45	68	
4	Bucovina Frătăuții Noi	32	19	3	10	70	37	+33	60	
5	Gura Humorului	32	21	4	7	92	42	+50	59 (Note: Gura Humorului was penalised with 8 points.)	
6	Minerul Iacobeni	32	18	5	9	83	60	+23	59	
7	Dorna Vatra Dornei	32	17	2	13	73	38	+35	53	
8	Rapid CFR II Mihoveni	32	16	3	13	89	75	+14	51	
9	Viitorul Liteni	32	14	2	16	66	60	+6	44	
10	Marginea	32	14	1	17	55	66	−11	43	
11	Zimbrul Siret	32	13	3	16	47	57	−10	42	
12	Unirea Boroaia	32	13	1	18	60	79	−19	40	
13	Voința Stroiești	32	9	5	18	37	74	−37	32	
14	Florconstruct Pătrăuți	32	9	1	22	43	88	−45	28	
15	Bucovina Rădăuți (R)	32	7	4	21	43	114	−71	25	Relegation to Liga V Suceava
16	Steaua Dumbrăveni (R)	32	4	3	25	16	78	−62	15 (Note: Steaua Dumbrăveni withdrew during the winter break and lost all matches from the second part by forfeit.)	Relegation to Liga V Suceava
17	Rarăul Câmpulung Moldovenesc (R)	32	4	3	25	28	115	−87	3 (Note: Rarăul Câmpulung Moldovenesc was penalised with 12 points.)	Relegation to Liga V Suceava
18	Danalis Zvoriștea (D)	0	0	0	0	0	0	0	0 (Note: Danalis Zvoriștea withdrew from the championship after 13 rounds and all its results were canceled.)	Expelled

Rules for classification: 1) Points; 2) Head-to-head points; 3) Head-to-head goal difference; 4) Head-to-head goals scored; 5) Head-to-head away goals scored; 6) Goal difference; 7) Goals scored.
(C) Champions; (D) Disqualified; (Q) Qualified for the phase indicated; (R) Relegated

=== Teleorman County ===
Pos	Team	Pld	W	D	L	GF	GA	GD	Pts	Qualification or relegation
1	Viață Nouă Olteni (C, Q)	30	24	2	4	93	33	+60	74	Qualification to promotion play-off
2	Metalul Frăsinet	30	21	4	5	77	33	+44	67	
3	Voința Saelele	30	19	4	7	83	39	+44	61	
4	Sporting Roșiori	30	14	5	11	64	44	+20	47	
5	Dunărea Zimnicea	30	14	3	13	63	50	+13	45	
6	Spicpo Poroschia	30	13	4	13	59	68	−9	43 (Note: Spicpo Poroschia: 10 pts, 13–13; Metalul Peretu: 9 pts, 15–9; Rapid Buzescu: 7 pts, 12–11; Petrolul Videle II: 7pts, 11-18)	
7	Metalul Peretu	30	12	7	11	64	54	+10	43	
8	Rapid Buzescu	30	13	4	13	52	53	−1	43	
9	Petrolul Videle II	30	13	4	13	55	73	−18	43	
10	Unirea Țigănești	30	13	3	14	52	67	−15	42	
11	Flacăra Talpa	30	13	2	15	50	61	−11	41	
12	Steaua Spătărei	30	12	2	16	52	71	−19	38	
13	CSȘ Alexandria	30	10	2	18	48	47	+1	32 (Note: Nanov 5-4 CSȘ Alexandria; CSȘ Alexandria 2–0 Nanov)	
14	Nanov (R)	30	10	2	18	49	65	−16	32	Relegation to Liga V Teleorman
15	Atletic Orbeasca (R)	30	7	7	16	43	65	−22	28	Relegation to Liga V Teleorman
16	Unirea Cosmești (R)	30	4	1	25	35	96	−61	13	Relegation to Liga V Teleorman

Rules for classification: 1) Points; 2) Head-to-head points; 3) Head-to-head goal difference; 4) Head-to-head goals scored; 5) Head-to-head away goals scored; 6) Goal difference; 7) Goals scored.
(C) Champions; (Q) Qualified for the phase indicated; (R) Relegated

=== Timiș County ===
Pos	Team	Pld	W	D	L	GF	GA	GD	Pts	Qualification or relegation
1	Flacăra Făget (C, Q)	34	28	6	0	127	15	+112	90	Qualification to promotion play-off
2	Juventus Pișchia	34	27	6	1	112	24	+88	87	
3	Chișoda	34	23	2	9	96	36	+60	71	
4	Timișul Șag	34	21	6	7	99	57	+42	69	
5	Pobeda Dudeștii Vechi	34	21	4	9	89	50	+39	67	
6	Spartak Gottlob	34	19	4	11	72	50	+22	61	
7	Dumbrăvița	34	16	8	10	57	39	+18	56	
8	Lugoj	34	17	3	14	89	54	+35	54	
9	Vulturii Pădureni	34	15	4	15	58	74	−16	49	
10	Politehnica 2002 Timișoara	34	15	3	16	66	62	+4	48	
11	Unirea Cerneteaz	34	14	2	18	72	95	−23	44	
12	Marcel Băban Jimbolia	34	13	2	19	48	64	−16	41	
13	Auto Timișoara	34	10	4	20	56	75	−19	34	
14	Peciu Nou	34	7	10	17	47	78	−31	31	
15	Deta	34	8	3	23	45	87	−42	27	
16	Real Dragșina	34	6	1	27	44	125	−81	19 (Note: Due to the promotion of Flacăra Făget to Liga III, Real Dragșina was spared from relegation.)	Spared from relegation
17	Viitorul Sânandrei (R)	34	9	3	22	57	94	−37	17 (Note: Viitorul Sânandrei deducted 13 points due to not achieving the 25 points limit in the Liga III last season.)	Relegation to Liga V Timiș
18	Informatica Timișoara (R)	34	1	1	32	31	186	−155	4	Relegation to Liga V Timiș

Rules for classification: 1) Points; 2) Head-to-head points; 3) Head-to-head goal difference; 4) Head-to-head goals scored; 5) Head-to-head away goals scored; 6) Goal difference; 7) Goals scored.
(C) Champions; (Q) Qualified for the phase indicated; (R) Relegated

=== Tulcea County ===
Pos	Team	Pld	W	D	L	GF	GA	GD	Pts	Qualification or relegation
1	Eolica Baia (C, Q)	22	21	1	0	135	30	+105	64	Qualification to promotion play-off
2	Unirea Casimcea	22	17	1	4	100	33	+67	52	
3	Razim Jurilovca	22	14	0	8	60	35	+25	42	
4	Luceafărul Slava Cercheză	22	12	1	9	51	38	+13	37	
5	Pescărușul Sarichioi	22	9	6	7	54	47	+7	33	
6	Flacăra Mihail Kogălniceanu	22	9	2	11	36	55	−19	29	
7	Granitul Babadag	22	8	4	10	56	69	−13	28	
8	Național Somova	22	8	4	10	35	69	−34	28	
9	Triumf Cerna	22	7	3	12	41	67	−26	24	
10	Săgeata Stejaru	22	7	1	14	43	76	−33	19 (Note: Săgeata Stejaru deducted 3 points.)	
11	Arrubium Măcin	22	4	3	15	27	66	−39	15	
12	Tractorul Horia	22	2	2	18	28	77	−49	8	

Rules for classification: 1) Points; 2) Head-to-head points; 3) Head-to-head goal difference; 4) Head-to-head goals scored; 5) Head-to-head away goals scored; 6) Goal difference; 7) Goals scored.
(C) Champions; (Q) Qualified for the phase indicated

=== Vaslui County ===
North Series

Pos	Team	Pld	W	D	L	GF	GA	GD	Pts	Qualification or relegation
1	Gârceni (Q)	18	15	3	0	73	18	+55	48	Qualification to championship play-off
2	Vaslui II (Q)	18	14	2	2	62	14	+48	37 (Note: Vaslui II deducted 7 points.)	Qualification to championship play-off
3	Avântul Zăpodeni (Q)	18	11	4	3	59	28	+31	37	Qualification to championship play-off
4	Vointa Ștefan cel Mare	18	12	0	6	43	32	+11	36	
5	Lipovăț	18	5	2	11	24	49	−25	17	
6	Înfrățirea Moara Greci	18	5	1	12	24	34	−10	16 (Note: Înfrățirea Moara Greci, Fortuna Vaslui and SMART Negrești withdrew from championship.)	
7	Dinamic Botești	18	5	1	12	19	49	−30	16	
8	Vulturul Bălteni	18	5	1	12	25	53	−28	13 (Note: Vulturul Bălteni deducted 3 points)	
9	Fortuna Vaslui	18	3	3	12	18	48	−30	12	
10	SMART Negrești	18	3	1	14	17	44	−27	10	

Rules for classification: 1) Points; 2) Head-to-head points; 3) Head-to-head goal difference; 4) Head-to-head goals scored; 5) Head-to-head away goals scored; 6) Goal difference; 7) Goals scored.
(Q) Qualified for the phase indicated
Notes:

South Series

Pos	Team	Pld	W	D	L	GF	GA	GD	Pts	Qualification or relegation
1	Huși (Q)	19	15	3	1	70	11	+59	48	Qualification to championship play-off
2	Vitis Șuletea (Q)	20	15	2	3	58	23	+35	47	Qualification to championship play-off
3	Flacăra Murgeni (Q)	20	12	3	5	58	21	+37	39	Qualification to championship play-off
4	Olimpia Stănilești	20	11	2	7	52	32	+20	35	
5	Multim Perieni	20	10	3	7	55	38	+17	33	
6	Juventus Fălciu	19	7	4	8	35	36	−1	25	
7	Autorom Pădureni	19	8	0	11	41	40	+1	24	
8	Gloria Lunca Banului	19	5	4	10	26	51	−25	19	
9	FDR Tutova	20	5	2	13	25	63	−38	17 (Note: FDR Tutova withdrew from championship.)	
10	Podgoria Oltenești	20	4	1	15	26	69	−43	13	
11	Progresul Găgești	19	2	0	17	22	80	−58	6	

Rules for classification: 1) Points; 2) Head-to-head points; 3) Head-to-head goal difference; 4) Head-to-head goals scored; 5) Head-to-head away goals scored; 6) Goal difference; 7) Goals scored.
(Q) Qualified for the phase indicated
Notes:

Championship play-off

Pos	Team	Pld	W	D	L	GF	GA	GD	Pts	Qualification
1	Huși (C, Q)	10	8	1	1	26	3	+23	25	Qualification to promotion play-off
2	Gârceni	10	7	2	1	21	12	+9	23	
3	Vaslui II	10	6	1	3	24	11	+13	19	
4	Vitis Șuletea	10	3	0	7	14	20	−6	9	
5	Flacăra Murgeni	10	2	1	7	14	26	−12	7	
6	Avântul Zăpodeni	10	1	1	8	11	38	−27	4	

Rules for classification: 1) Points; 2) Head-to-head points; 3) Head-to-head goal difference; 4) Head-to-head goals scored; 5) Head-to-head away goals scored; 6) Goal difference; 7) Goals scored.
(C) Champions; (Q) Qualified for the phase indicated

=== Vâlcea County ===
Pos	Team	Pld	W	D	L	GF	GA	GD	Pts	Qualification or relegation
1	Damila Măciuca (C, Q)	34	30	3	1	161	37	+124	93	Qualification to promotion play-off
2	Voința Orlești	34	24	7	3	105	34	+71	79	
3	Posada Perișani	34	25	3	6	101	49	+52	78	
4	Hidroelectra Râmnicu Vâlcea	34	23	3	8	129	44	+85	72	
5	Minerul Berbești	34	19	7	8	84	36	+48	64	
6	Viitorul Valea Mare	34	15	7	12	79	77	+2	52	
7	Dinamo Râmnicu Vâlcea	34	16	4	14	81	69	+12	52	
8	Flacăra Horezu	34	15	5	14	95	88	+7	50	
9	Șirineasa	34	14	7	13	73	69	+4	49	
10	Cozia Călimănești	34	12	5	17	72	81	−9	41	
11	Nova Turist Mihăești	34	12	5	17	73	95	−22	41	
12	Lotru Brezoi	34	10	7	17	59	92	−33	37	
13	Drăgășani	34	12	3	19	53	73	−20	36 (Note: Drăgășani deducted 3 points.)	
14	Băbeni	34	10	2	22	60	123	−63	32	
15	Oltețul Zătreni	34	10	2	22	63	92	−29	32	
16	Victoria Frâncești (R)	34	10	1	23	56	127	−71	31	Relegation to Liga V Vâlcea
17	Unirea Păușești-Măglași (R)	34	5	5	24	49	115	−66	20	Relegation to Liga V Vâlcea
18	Oltețul Alunu (R)	34	5	2	27	37	129	−92	17	Relegation to Liga V Vâlcea

Rules for classification: 1) Points; 2) Head-to-head points; 3) Head-to-head goal difference; 4) Head-to-head goals scored; 5) Head-to-head away goals scored; 6) Goal difference; 7) Goals scored.
(C) Champions; (Q) Qualified for the phase indicated; (R) Relegated

=== Vrancea County ===
North Series

Pos	Team	Pld	W	D	L	GF	GA	GD	Pts	Qualification or relegation
1	Național Golești (Q)	24	22	1	1	148	14	+134	67	Qualification to championship play-off
2	Viitorul Homocea (Q)	24	19	3	2	89	23	+66	60	Qualification to championship play-off
3	Unirea Țifești	24	13	5	6	59	36	+23	44	
4	Avântul Jariștea	24	13	4	7	64	33	+31	43	
5	Focșani II	24	11	5	8	59	47	+12	38	
6	Șoimii Mircești	24	12	2	10	52	43	+9	38	
7	Mărășești	24	10	3	11	54	46	+8	33	
8	Adjud	24	10	2	12	55	64	−9	32	
9	Voința Odobești	24	9	4	11	36	41	−5	31	
10	Unirea Pufești	24	7	2	15	38	74	−36	23	
11	Siretul Suraia	24	6	3	15	35	79	−44	21	
12	GV Ploscuțeni	24	4	1	19	22	101	−79	13	
13	Trotușul Ruginești	24	2	1	21	32	142	−110	7	

Rules for classification: 1) Points; 2) Head-to-head points; 3) Head-to-head goal difference; 4) Head-to-head goals scored; 5) Head-to-head away goals scored; 6) Goal difference; 7) Goals scored.
(Q) Qualified for the phase indicated

South Series

Pos	Team	Pld	W	D	L	GF	GA	GD	Pts	Qualification or relegation
1	Energia Vulturu (Q)	24	21	2	1	113	34	+79	65	Qualification to championship play-off
2	Voința Slobozia Ciorăști (Q)	24	20	1	3	76	29	+47	61	Qualification to championship play-off
3	Dinamo Cârligele	24	12	7	5	75	39	+36	43	
4	Flacăra Urechești	24	14	1	9	47	45	+2	43	
5	Dinamo Tătăranu	24	12	3	9	55	50	+5	39	
6	Bălești	24	11	5	8	73	48	+25	38	
7	Unirea Milcovul	24	10	5	9	43	56	−13	35	
8	Victoria Gugești	24	9	3	12	44	55	−11	30	
9	Victoria Bordeasca	24	7	3	14	44	56	−12	24	
10	Câmpineanca	24	7	5	12	42	53	−11	23 (Note: Câmpineanca deducted 3 points.)	
11	Șoimii Năruja	24	6	3	15	41	68	−27	21	
12	Zorile Cotești	24	5	1	18	26	75	−49	16	
13	Victoria Gologanu	24	2	1	21	20	91	−71	7	

Rules for classification: 1) Points; 2) Head-to-head points; 3) Head-to-head goal difference; 4) Head-to-head goals scored; 5) Head-to-head away goals scored; 6) Goal difference; 7) Goals scored.
(Q) Qualified for the phase indicated
Notes:

Championship play-off
Semi-finals

Team 1	Agg.	Team 2	1st leg	2nd leg
Voința Slobozia Ciorăști	2–12	Național Golești	1–3	1–9
Viitorul Homocea	4–2	Energia Vulturu	3–1	1–1

Final

Team 1	Score	Team 2
Național Golești	2–1	Viitorul Homocea

Național Golești won the 2010–11 Liga IV Vrancea County and qualify to promotion play-off in Liga III.

== See also ==
- 2010–11 Liga I
- 2010–11 Liga II
- 2010–11 Liga III
