= ACS Înainte Modelu =

Romanian football club

Înainte Modelu
- Full name: Asociația Club Sportiv; Înainte Modelu
- Nicknames: Modelenii (The People from Modelu)
- Short name: Modelu
- Founded: 2009; 17 years ago
- Ground: Vasile Enache
- Capacity: 1,150
- Owner: Modelu Commune
- Chairman: Mihai Comșa
- Manager: Virgil Nițoi
- League: Liga III
- 2025–26: Liga III, Seria II, 6th
Home colours	Away colours

Asociația Club Sportiv Înainte Modelu, commonly known as Înainte Modelu, or simply as Modelu, is a Romanian football club based in Modelu, Călărași County, founded in 2009. The club is currently playing in the Liga III.

== History ==
Înainte Modelu was founded in 2009 in order to continue the football tradition in the commune after the dissolution of former Liga II side Prefab 05 Modelu. Înainte managed to won Liga IV – Călărași County in 2014, at five years after their foundation, subsequently winning the promotion play-off against Petrolul Roata and promoting to Liga III, for the first time in the history of the club.

In the third tier, Înainte won the reputation of an uncomfortable team being ranked: 8th (2014–15), 6th (2015–16), 8th (2017–18) and 7th (2018–19), with only a bottom side classification, a 12 place at the end of the 2016–17 season.

== Grounds ==
Înainte Modelu plays its home matches on Vasile Enache Stadium in Modelu, Călărași County, with a capacity of 1,150 seats. The old stadium of Prefab 05, Prefab Stadium, with a capacity of 5,000 seats is unused, being in a state of degradation.

== Honours ==
Liga IV – Călărași County

- Winners (1): 2013–14
- Runners-up (1): 2011–12

== Players ==
=== First team squad ===
As of 21. 2026

Note: Flags indicate national team as defined under FIFA eligibility rules; some limited exceptions apply. Players may hold more than one non-FIFA nationality.

No.	Pos.	Nation	Player
1	GK	ROU	Alexandru Petreacă
15	DF	NGR	Yunus Fatai
4	DF	ROU	Bogdan Matei
3	MF	ROU	Cristian Stoian
9	FW	ROU	Cristian Chiriță
10	FW	ROU	Daniel Gheorghe (Captain)
14	MF	GHA	Charles McCarthy
19	MF	ROU	Eduard Gheorghiu
99	GK	ROU	Mădălin Guță
21	MF	ROU	Cătălin Măgureanu
23	DF	ROU	Mario Mateiu
5	MF	ROU	Andrei Tuluca
11	MF	ROU	Cristian Tanasescu
98	RB	ROU	Luca Burlacu
15	DF	NGR	Kazeem Fatai

=== Out on loan ===
Note: Flags indicate national team as defined under FIFA eligibility rules; some limited exceptions apply. Players may hold more than one non-FIFA nationality.

No. / Pos. / Nation / Player	No. / Pos. / Nation / Player

== Club officials ==
=== Board of directors ===
Role	Name
Owner	(Romania) Modelu Commune
President	(Romania) Mihai Comșa
Honorary president	(Romania) Gheorghe Dobre
Vice-president	(Romania) Nicolae Toma
Sporting director	(Romania) Petre Pãpuricã
Technical director	(Romania) -
Stadium administrator	(Romania) Marian Prodan

=== Current technical staff ===
Role	Name
Manager	(Romania) Virgil Nițoi
Assistant manager	(Romania) Bogdan Matei

== League history ==
Season	Tier	Division	Place	Notes	Cupa României
2025–26	3	Liga III (Seria III)	TBD		
2024–25	3	Liga III (Seria III)	6th		
2023–24	3	Liga III (Seria III)	8th		
2022–23	3	Liga III (Seria III)	4th		
2021–22	3	Liga III (Seria III)	8th		
2020–21	3	Liga III (Seria III)	7th		
2019–20	3	Liga III (Seria II)	5th		
2018–19	3	Liga III (Seria II)	7th		
2017–18	3	Liga III (Seria II)	8th		
2016–17	3	Liga III (Seria II)	12th		
2015–16	3	Liga III (Seria II)	6th		
2014–15	3	Liga III (Seria II)	8th		
2013–14	4	Liga IV (CL)	1st (C)	Promoted	
2011–12	4	Liga IV (CL) (Series C)	2nd	Semifinals	
2010–11	4	Liga IV (CL) (Series C)	5th		

== Former managers ==
- (Romania) Constantin Ilie (2022–2023)
- (Romania) Marcel Abăluță (2023)
- (Romania) Virgil Nițoi (2023–)
