= Stadionul Prefab =

Multi-use stadium in Modelu, Romania

- Interactive map of Stadionul Prefab
- Address: Str. Călărași, nr. 175 b
- Location: Modelu, Romania
- Coordinates: 44°12′5.52″N 27°23′38.68″E
- Owner: Marian Miluț
- Capacity: 5,000 seated
- Surface: Grass

Construction
- Opened: 2005
- Closed: 2008

Tenant
- Prefab Modelu (2005–2008)

Stadionul Prefab is a multi-use stadium in Modelu, Călărași County, Romania. The stadium was used mostly for football matches, was the home ground of Prefab Modelu and has a capacity of 5,000 seats.

The stadium was built with the financial support of Marian Miluț, founder and owner of Prefab Modelu. After the dissolution of the club, the stadium was closed, the new team of the commune, Înainte Modelu playing its matches on Stadionul Vasile Enache, with a capacity of only 1,000 seats.
