= Florentin Rădulescu =

Romanian footballer

Personal information
- Date of birth: 29 July 1976 (age 50)
- Place of birth: Pucioasa, Romania
- Height: 1.81 m (5 ft 11 in)
- Position: Goalkeeper

Youth career
- Flacăra Moreni

Senior career*
Years	Team	Apps	(Gls)
1993–1996	Flacăra Moreni	3	(0)
1997–1999	Petrolul Ploiești	72	(0)
2000–2002	Rapid București	19	(0)
2001	→ Rocar București (loan)	13	(0)
2002–2003	Astra Ploiești	5	(0)
2003–2004	Argeș Pitești	11	(0)
2004	Petrolul Ploiești	0	(0)
2005	FC Vaslui	0	(0)
2005	Petrolistul Boldești		
2005–2007	Otopeni	30	(0)
2007–2008	Prefab Modelu	24	(0)
2009	Viitorul Pucioasa		
2009–2010	Petrolistul Boldești		
2010–2011	Viitorul Domnești		
Total		177+	(0)

Managerial career
- 2013–2015: Academica Argeș (GK coach)
- 2017–2018: Astra II Giurgiu (GK coach)
- 2018–2019: Sepsi OSK (GK coach)
- 2019: Dinamo București (GK coach)
- 2019: Hermannstadt (GK coach)
- 2021–2022: Dinamo București (GK coach)
- 2022–2023: Universitatea Cluj (GK coach)
- 2023–2025: Universitatea Cluj (GK coach)
- * Club domestic league appearances and goals

Florentin Rădulescu (born 29 July 1976) is a Romanian former professional footballer who played as a goalkeeper.

== Honours ==
Rocar București

- Cupa României runner-up: 2000–01

Rapid București

- Cupa României: 2001–02
