= 2001 Cupa României final =

- Event: 2000–01 Cupa României
Dinamo București	Rocar București
Divizia A	Divizia A
4	2
- Date: 16 June 2001
- Venue: Stadionul Naţional, Bucharest
- Referee: Urs Meier (Switzerland)
- Attendance: 26,000

The 2001 Cupa României final was the 63rd final of Romania's most prestigious cup competition. The final was played at the Stadionul Naţional in Bucharest on 16 June 2001 and was contested between Divizia A sides Dinamo București and Rocar București. The cup was won by Dinamo.

== Route to the final ==
FC Dinamo București

Round of 32	Extensiv Craiova	0–3	Dinamo București
Round of 16	Dinamo București	3–2	Universitatea Craiova
Quarter-finals	Rapid București	1–2	Dinamo București
Semi-finals 1st Leg	Sportul Studenţesc București	2–2	Dinamo București
Semi-finals 2nd Leg	Dinamo București	3–1	Sportul Studenţesc București

AFC Rocar București

Round of 32	Dacia Unirea Brăila	1–2 (a.e.t, g.g.)	Rocar București
Round of 16	Rocar București	2–0	Ceahlăul Piatra Neamţ
Quarter-finals	Naţional București	0–1	Rocar București
Semi-finals 1st Leg	Rocar București	3–0	Petrolul Ploieşti
Semi-finals 2nd Leg	Petrolul Ploieşti	1–1	Rocar București

== Match details ==
16 June 2001
21:30 EEST

Dinamo București	4–2	Rocar București
Mihalcea 6', 72'; Niculae 55', 68' (pen.)	Report	Ursu 9'; Nicolae 30'

Stadionul Naţional
Attendance: 26,000
Referee: Urs Meier (Switzerland)

Dinamo București	Rocar București

DINAMO BUCUREŞTI:
GK	23	(Romania) Florin Prunea
DF	7	(Romania) Valentin Năstase	(yellow card) 89'
DF	4	(Romania) Gheorghe Mihali
DF	6	(Romania) Bogdan Onuț
MF	2	(Romania) Giani Kiriţă
MF	10	(Romania) Ioan Lupescu (c)
MF	3	(Romania) Iosif Tâlvan
MF	5	(Romania) Mugur Bolohan	(yellow card) 33'
MF	8	(Romania) Iulian Tameș	(yellow card) 87'	(substituted off) 87'
FW	9	(Romania) Adrian Mihalcea	(yellow card) 70'	(substituted off) 82'
FW	16	(Romania) Marius Niculae	(yellow card) 45'	(substituted off) 90'
Substitutes:
MF	14	(Romania) Ionuţ Badea		(substituted in) 87'
MF	13	(Romania) Ianis Zicu		(substituted in) 90'
FW	19	(Romania) Claudiu Drăgan		(substituted in) 82'
Manager:
(Romania) Cornel Dinu

ROCAR BUCUREŞTI:
GK	12	(Romania) Florentin Rădulescu
DF	3	(Romania) Ion Voicu		(substituted off) 43'
DF	6	(Romania) Călin Zanc
DF	4	(Romania) Cornel Cristescu
DF	5	(Romania) Leonard Nemțanu
MF	2	(Romania) Cosmin Ursu
MF	10	(Romania) Marius Șuleap
MF	8	(Romania) Romulus Buia (c)	(yellow card) 88'
MF	7	(Romania) Dan Alexa
FW	9	(Romania) Petruș Manta		(substituted off) 61'
FW	11	(Romania) Mihai Nicolae		(substituted off) 80'
Substitutes:
DF	16	(Romania) Irinel Voicu	(yellow card) 45'	(substituted in) 43'
FW	15	(Romania) Victoraș Iacob		(substituted in) 61'
FW	14	(Romania) Bogdan Vrăjitoarea		(substituted in) 80'
Manager:
(Romania) Dumitru Dumitriu

MATCH OFFICIALS

- Assistant referees:
  - (Switzerland) Laurent Rausis
  - (Switzerland) Antonio Vecchio
- Fourth official:

MAN OF THE MATCH

MATCH RULES

- 90 minutes.
- 30 minutes extra-time (15-minute intervals)
- Penalty shoot-out if scores level after extra time.
- Seven named substitutes
- Maximum of 3 substitutions.
