= Marian Petre Miluț =

Romanian politician, engineer and businessman

Marian Petre Miluţ (born 29 December 1955, Craiova, Dolj County, Romania) is a Romanian politician, engineer and businessman. He was president of the Romanian Small and Medium Entrepreneurs Union, assisting the Union's co-operation with the European People's Party (EPP), and president of the Christian Democratic National Peasants' Party (PNȚ-CD). He has promoted and helped modernise Romanian small and medium enterprise, and has organized a series of debates on the modernising of Romanian infrastructure.He provided financial support for building the Stadionul Prefab.

== Honours ==
- (Romania) Romanian Royal Family: 41st Knight of the Royal Decoration of the Cross of the Romanian Royal House

=== Presidential elections ===
Election	Affiliation	First round			Second round		
Election	Affiliation	Votes	Percentage	Position	Votes	Percentage	Position
2004	People's Action (AP)	43,378	0.4%	9th			
