= Vasile Enache Stadium =

Multi-use stadium in Modelu, Romania

- Interactive map of Vasile Enache Stadium
- Address: Str. Prelungirea Canalului
- Location: Modelu, Romania
- Coordinates: 44°12′8.06″N 27°23′5.89″E
- Owner: Commune of Modelu
- Operator: Înainte Modelu
- Capacity: 1,000 seated
- Surface: Grass

Construction
- Opened: 2009

Tenant
- Înainte Modelu (2009–present)

The Vasile Enache Stadium is a multi-use stadium in Modelu, Romania. It is currently used mostly for football matches and is the home ground of Înainte Modelu. The stadium holds 1,000 people.
