= Dumitru Hotoboc =

Romanian footballer

Personal information
- Full name: Dumitru Hotoboc
- Date of birth: 23 December 1978 (age 47)
- Place of birth: Târgu Jiu, Romania
- Height: 1.87 m (6 ft 2 in)
- Position: Goalkeeper

Team information
- Current team: Farul Constanța (GK coach)

Youth career
- –1997: Jiul Petroșani

Senior career*
Years	Team	Apps	(Gls)
1997–1998	Politehnica Timișoara	3	(0)
1998–1999	Jiul Petroșani	9	(0)
1999	Steaua București	5	(0)
2000–2006	Jiul Petroșani	122	(0)
2007–2008	Argeș Pitești	17	(0)
2008	Prefab 05 Modelu	4	(0)
2009	Jiul Petroșani	30	(0)
2010	Minerul Lupeni	9	(0)
2010–2011	FC Universitatea Craiova	0	(0)
2011–2012	Jiul Petroșani		
2013	Turnu Severin	3	(0)
2013–2014	FC Universitatea Craiova	18	(0)
2014–2015	Oțelul Galați	14	(0)
2015–2017	Politehnica Iași	0	(0)
Total		234	(0)

Managerial career
- 2017–2019: Argeș Pitești (GK coach)
- 2019–2023: Chindia Târgoviște (GK coach)
- 2023: Universitatea Cluj (GK coach)
- 2024: Voluntari (GK coach)
- 2024–2026: Rapid București (GK coach)
- 2026–: Farul Constanța (GK coach)
- * Club domestic league appearances and goals

Dumitru Hotoboc (born 23 December 1978) is a Romanian former professional footballer who played as a goalkeeper, currently goalkeeping coach at Liga I club Farul Constanța.

== Honours ==
Jiul Petroșani

- Divizia B: 2004–05
- Divizia C: 2002–03

Argeș Pitești

- Liga II: 2007–08
