= Pucioasa =

- Town
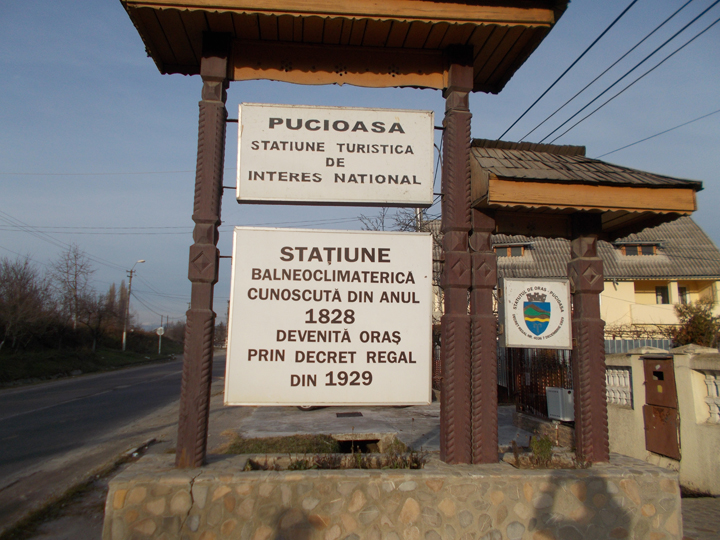
- Entrance to Pucioasa

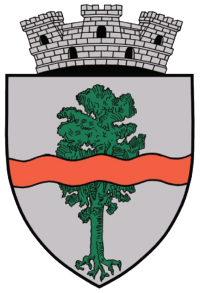
- Coat of arms

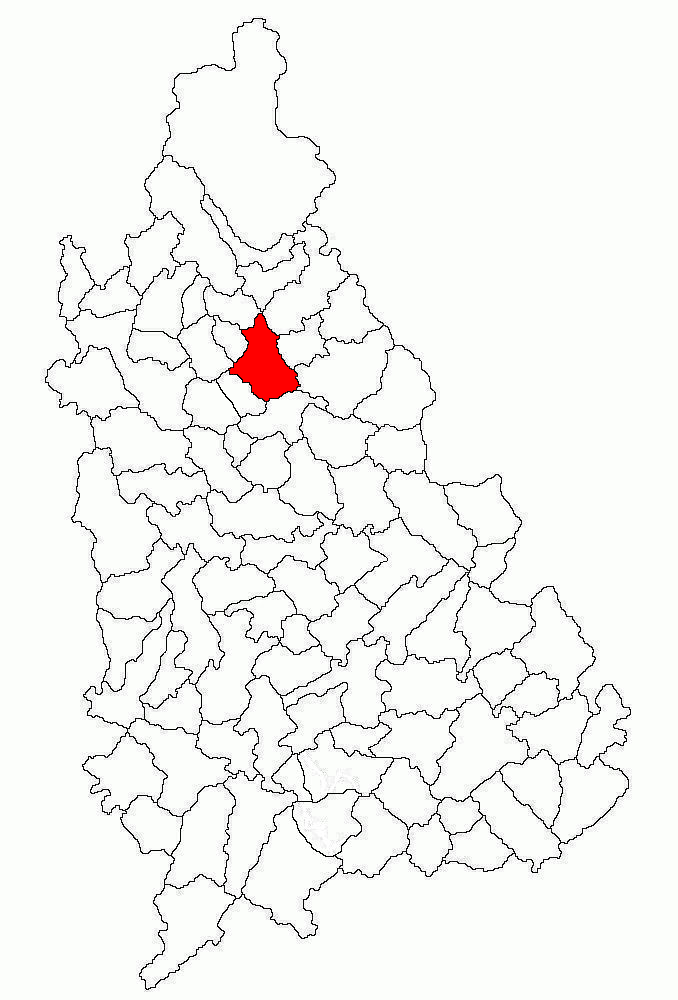
- Location in Dâmbovița County

- Location in Romania
- Coordinates: 45°4′27″N 25°26′3″E
- Country: Romania
- County: Dâmbovița

Government
  - Mayor (2024–2028): Constantin Ana (PSD)
- Area: 42.59 km^{2} (16.44 sq mi)
- Elevation: 397 m (1,302 ft)
- Population (2021-12-01): 12,953
  - Density: 304.1/km^{2} (787.7/sq mi)
- Time zone: UTC+02:00 (EET)
  - Summer (DST): UTC+03:00 (EEST)
- Postal code: 135400
- Area code: (+40) 02 45
- Vehicle reg.: DB
- Website: www.primpuc.ro

Pucioasa (Romanian pronunciation: [puˈt͡ʃjo̯asa]) is a town in Dâmbovița County, Muntenia, Romania. It administers six villages: Bela, Diaconești, Glodeni, Malurile, Miculești, and Pucioasa-Sat.

The town is located on the middle course of the Ialomița River, 21 km (13 mi) north of Târgoviște, in the central, hilly area of the county, 81 km (50 mi) from its southern limit and 42 km (26 mi) from its northern limit.

== History ==
Historical population
Year	Pop.	±%
1930	5,772	—
1948	4,643	−19.6%
1956	9,259	+99.4%
1966	11,212	+21.1%
1977	13,555	+20.9%
1992	16,601	+22.5%
2002	16,489	−0.7%
2011	14,254	−13.6%
2021	12,953	−9.1%
Source: Census data

The name of the town dates from 20 September 1649, when it was mentioned in a document as "Piatra Pucioasă" (meaning Brimstone, referring to the sulphur resources nearby).

== Natives ==
- Alexandru Bădoiu (born 1981), footballer
- Cristian Bălașa (born 1972), footballer
- Romulus Ciobanu (born 1977), footballer
- Grigoraș Diaconescu (born 1982), rugby union football player
- Constantin Năstăsescu (born 1943), mathematician, titular member of the Romanian Academy
- Dumitru Popescu (1942–1997), footballer
- Florentin Rădulescu (born 1976), footballer
