= Călin Zanc =

Romanian footballer

Personal information
- Full name: Călin Andrei Zanc
- Date of birth: 21 August 1971
- Place of birth: Dej, Romania
- Date of death: 10 September 2014 (aged 43)
- Place of death: Jichișu de Jos, Romania
- Height: 1.89 m (6 ft 2 in)
- Positions: Central defender; right back

Youth career
- CSM Dej
- Viitorul Târgu Mureș

Senior career*
Years	Team	Apps	(Gls)
1989–1994	Universitatea Cluj	111	(8)
1994	Corvinul Hunedoara	14	(1)
1995	Unirea Dej	11	(0)
1995	Universitatea Cluj	17	(0)
1996–1998	Sportul Studențesc București	56	(4)
1998	Universitatea Cluj	12	(1)
1999–2000	Cetate Deva (Note: The statistics for the 1999–2000 Divizia C season are unavailable.)	12	(0)
2000–2001	Rocar București	14	(1)
2001–2002	AEK București	25	(3)
2002–2003	Politehnica Timișoara	20	(0)
Total		292	(18)

International career
	Romania U18	10	(0)
	Romania U21	1	(0)
1995	Romania B	1	(0)

Managerial career
- 2004: Politehnica Timișoara (caretaker)
- * Club domestic league appearances and goals

Călin Andrei Zanc (21 August 1971 – 10 September 2014) was a Romanian footballer who played as a defender.

== Club career ==
Zanc was born on 21 August 1971 in Dej, Romania and began playing junior-level football at CSM Dej before moving to Viitorul Târgu Mureș. He started his senior career at Universitatea Cluj, making his Divizia A debut under coach Cornel Dinu on 23 August 1989 in a 4–1 away loss to Inter Sibiu. The team suffered relegation at the end of the 1990–91 season, but he stayed with the club, helping it gain promotion back to the first league after one year.

In 1994, Zanc joined Divizia B club Corvinul Hunedoara, before moving midway through the 1994–95 season to Unirea Dej. He returned to Divizia A football in 1995 by rejoining "U" Cluj. He played for them in two losses to Tromsø and Germinal Ekeren in the 1995 Intertoto Cup. In the middle of the 1995–96 season, he went to play for Sportul Studențesc București. After Sportul suffered relegation at the end of the 1997–98 season, Zanc moved back to Universitatea Cluj for a third stint. In the middle of the 1998–99 season, he left "U" and joined Cetate Deva in Divizia B. He could not help the team avoid relegation at the end of the season, but Zanc continued to play for Cetate and helped them achieve promotion back to the second league after one year.

In 2000, Zanc went to play for Rocar București. The team reached the 2001 Cupa României final, where he played the entire match under coach Dumitru Dumitriu in the 4–2 loss to Dinamo București. He then moved to Divizia B club AEK București, helping them gain promotion to the first league at the end of the 2001–02 season. Afterwards, the club merged with CSU Timișoara and became Politehnica Timișoara. Zanc made his last Divizia A appearance on 28 May 2003 in Politehinca's 2–1 home win against Astra Ploiești, totaling 207 matches with nine goals in the competition.

== International career ==
Zanc played 10 matches for Romania's under-18 national team and one game for the under-21 side.

Zanc played one game for Romania B under coach Anghel Iordănescu on 27 September 1995 in a 2–2 draw at Belo Horizonte against the equivalent team of Brazil, whose squad featured players Sávio, Zé Roberto and Dida among others.

== Managerial career ==
After ending his playing career, Zanc worked as a sporting director and assistant coach for Politehnica Timișoara, also having a spell as the club's caretaker coach in 2004.

== Death ==
Zanc died in a road accident on 10 September 2014 at the age of 43, after the driver of the car in which he was a passenger lost control and crashed into a fence in Jichișu de Jos.

== Honours ==
Universitatea Cluj

- Divizia B: 1991–92

Cetate Deva

- Divizia C: 1999–2000

Rocar București

- Cupa României runner-up: 2000–01

AEK București

- Divizia B: 2001–02
