= Alexandru Bădoiu =

Romanian footballer

Alexandru Badoiu
Personal information
- Full name: Alexandru Nicolae Badoiu
- Date of birth: 17 August 1981 (age 45)
- Place of birth: Pucioasa, Romania
- Height: 1.78 m (5 ft 10 in)
- Position: Right-back

Senior career*
Years	Team	Apps	(Gls)
2002–2003	FCM Reşiţa	19	(3)
2003–2006	Jiul Petroşani	71	(6)
2006	Politehnica Timişoara	5	(0)
2007–2008	Jiul Petroşani	15	(1)
2008–2009	FCM Târgu Mureș	6	(0)
Total		116	(10)
- * Club domestic league appearances and goals

Alexandru Nicolae Bădoiu (born 17 August 1981, in Pucioasa) is a retired Romanian football player.

Bădoiu started his career at FCM Reşiţa before moving to Jiul Petroşani, where he won promotion to the first league. He was transferred by FCU Politehnica Timişoara in the summer of 2006, for 400.000 Euros, but returned in the winter of the same year to Jiul, for a fraction of that sum.

== See also ==
- Football in Romania
- List of football clubs in Romania
