= Cătălin Măgureanu =

Romanian professional footballer

Personal information
- Full name: Cătălin Ionuț Măgureanu
- Date of birth: 5 June 2000 (age 26)
- Place of birth: Bucharest, Romania
- Height: 1.81 m (5 ft 11 in)
- Position: Attacking midfielder

Team information
- Current team: Înainte Modelu
- Number: 21

Youth career
- 2010–2012: Steaua București
- 2012–2019: Dinamo București

Senior career*
Years	Team	Apps	(Gls)
2019–2022	Dinamo București	19	(0)
2019	→ Dunărea Călărași (loan)	1	(0)
2019–2020	→ Afumați (loan)	14	(2)
2022–	Înainte Modelu	18	(1)
- * Club domestic league appearances and goals as of 07:37, 7 December 2024 (UTC)

Cătălin Ionuț Măgureanu (born 5 June 2000) is a Romanian professional footballer who plays as an attacking midfielder for Înainte Modelu.

He came close to sign for Napoli in 2016, but his parents decided to keep him at Dinamo București. In September 2020, he signed a new contract with Dinamo.

== Career statistics ==
=== Club ===
As of match played 20 December 2021

Appearances and goals by club, season and competition
Club	Season	League			National Cup (Note: Includes Cupa României)		Europe		Other (Note: Appearances in Supercupa României)		Total	
Club	Season	Division	Apps	Goals	Apps	Goals	Apps	Goals	Apps	Goals	Apps	Goals
Dunărea Călărași (loan)	2019–20	Liga II	1	0	0	0	0	0	0	0	1	0
Dunărea Călărași (loan)	Total		1	0	0	0	0	0	0	0	1	0
Afumați (loan)	2019–20	Liga III	14	2	0	0	0	0	0	0	14	2
Afumați (loan)	Total		14	2	0	0	0	0	0	0	14	2
Dinamo București	2020–21	Liga I	10	0	2	0	0	0	0	0	12	0
Dinamo București	2021–22	Liga I	9	0	0	0	0	0	0	0	9	0
Dinamo București	Total		19	0	2	0	0	0	0	0	21	0
Career Total			34	2	2	0	0	0	0	0	36	2
