= FC Prefab 05 Modelu =

Prefab 05 Modelu
- Full name: Fotbal Club Prefab 05 Modelu
- Short name: Prefab Modelu
- Founded: 2005
- Dissolved: 2008
- Ground: Prefab
- Capacity: 5,000
- Website: http://prefab05modelu.uv.ro/
| Home colours | Away colours |

Prefab 05 Modelu was a Romanian professional football club from Modelu, Călărași County, founded in 2005 and dissolved in 2008.

The club played for two and a half seasons in the Liga II, between 2006 and 2008, but the lack of results forced its owner to dissolve it.

== Notable former players ==
The footballers mentioned below have played at least 1 season for Prefab and also played in Liga I for another team.

- (Romania) Ionuț Curcă
- (Romania) Dumitru Hotoboc
- (Romania) Vasile Olariu
- (Romania) Alin Șeroni
- (Romania) Dinu Sănmărtean
