= Modelu =

- Commune
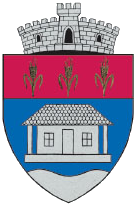
- Coat of arms

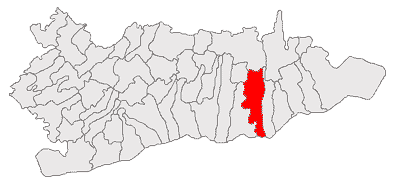
- Location in Călărași County

- Location in Romania
- Coordinates: 44°12′N 27°23′E
- Country: Romania
- County: Călărași

Government
  - Mayor (2024–2028): Gheorghe Dobre (PNL)
- Area: 111.71 km^{2} (43.13 sq mi)
- Elevation: 19 m (62 ft)
- Population (2021-12-01): 10,052
  - Density: 89.983/km^{2} (233.05/sq mi)
- Time zone: UTC+02:00 (EET)
  - Summer (DST): UTC+03:00 (EEST)
- Postal code: 917180
- Area code: +(40) 242
- Vehicle reg.: CL
- Website: www.primariamodelu.ro

Modelu is a commune in Călărași County, Muntenia, Romania. It is composed of four villages: Modelu, Radu Negru, Stoenești, and Tonea.

Historical population
Year	Pop.	±%
2002	9,804	—
2011	9,839	+0.4%
2021	10,052	+2.2%
Source: Census data

At the 2021 census, the commune had a population of 10,052. Since 2004, the mayor has been Gheorghe Dobre of the National Liberal Party.
