= Dâmbovnic =

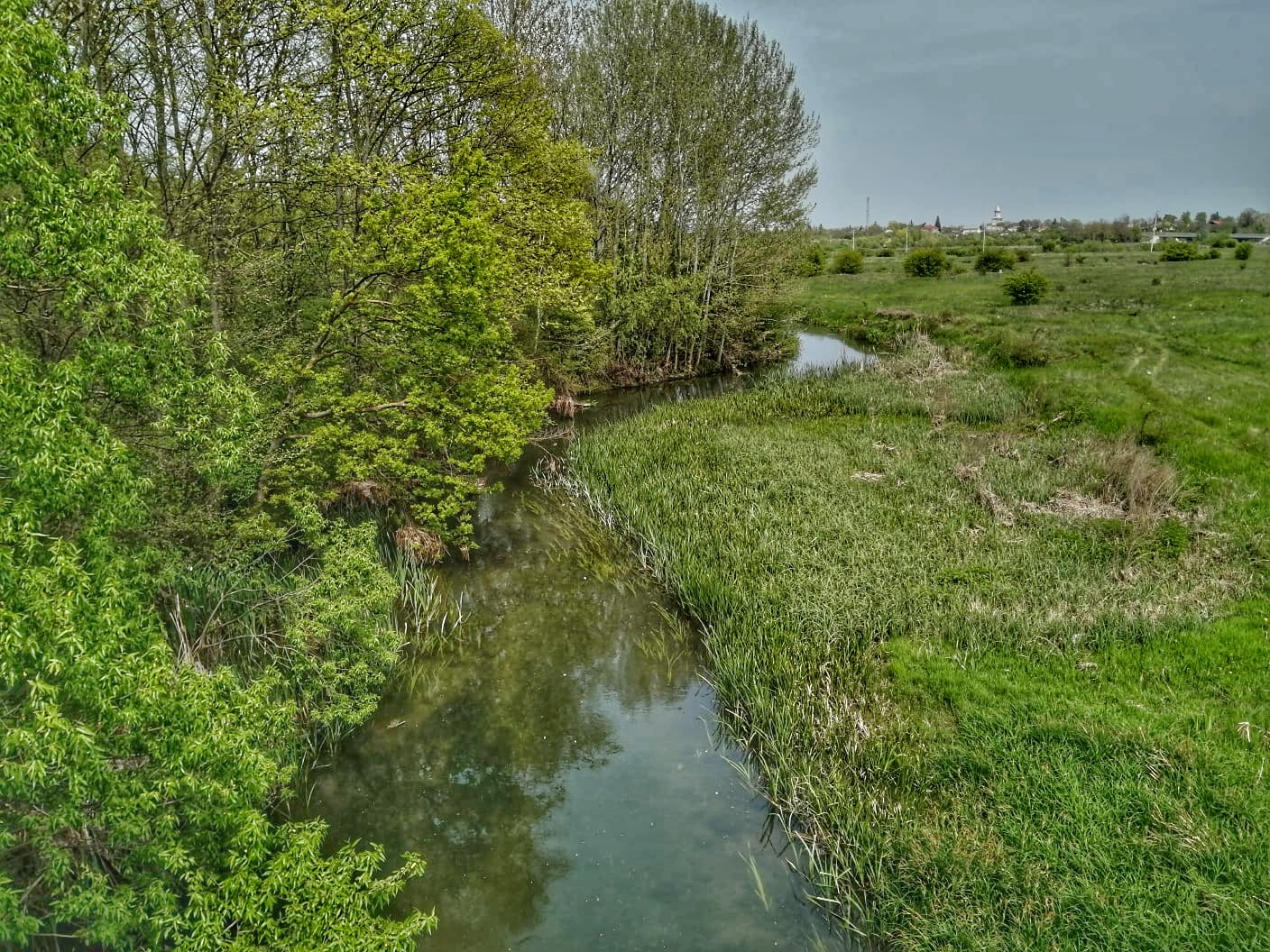

- Location within Romania

Location
- Country: Romania
- Counties: Argeș, Dâmbovița, Teleorman, Giurgiu

Physical characteristics
- Mouth: Neajlov
  - location: Vadu Lat
  - coordinates: 44.3426°N 25.6694°E
- Length: 110 km (68 mi)
- Basin size: 639 km^{2} (247 sq mi)

Basin features
- Progression: Neajlov→ Argeș→ Danube→ Black Sea
- Tributaries
  - left: Mozacu, Jirnov
  - right: Rața, Gligan, Berivoaia, Negrișoara

The Dâmbovnic is a right tributary of the river Neajlov in Romania. It discharges into the Neajlov in Obedeni. Its length is 110 km (68 mi) and its basin size is 639 km^{2} (247 sq mi).

== Geography ==
The river flows through four different counties: Argeș, Dâmbovița, Teleorman and Giurgiu. It flows from North-West to South-East and forms near the high plains of Pitești, where it receives residual water from Arpechim. Then, it passes through the Găvanu-Burdea Plain and finally ends into the Neajlov River, near Clejani. It is a permanent river. It flows through the villages Bradu, Suseni, Pădureni, Gălășești, Rociu, Bârlogu, Negrași, Mozăceni, Slobozia, Șelaru, Vătași, Drăghinești, Gratia, Cartojani, Sadina, Roata de Jos, Mârșa and Uiești.

=== Protected areas ===
At the confluence with the river Mozacu, is a small reservation, Negrași Daffodil Meadow.

== Human impact on the river ==
The only part of the valley that is not affected by human activities is the upper part, above the Dâmbovnic Lake. At this part, the river can dry up in summer.

The only lake is the Dâmbovnic Lake, situated at the place where the residual water from Arpechim flows into the river through a 5.8 km long canal. The lake is very important and is used as a cleaning station for the toxic wastes. Work is done in order to remove the toxic sediments in the lake and to improve the natural and artificial filters. Downstream, the river is drained.

=== Pollution ===
In the past, the water was very polluted. This affects the river itself, underground water and local villages. The main source of pollution was the Arpechim Refinery, which was closed in 2011. Record fines were given in 2007. However, there are other sources of pollution, like petrol, when oil pipes are broken by thieves. In the lower part of the valley, pollution may accidentally come from local villagers who wash their cars and animals in the river or take construction materials from the riverbed.

However, recent studies show that the ecosystems are not endangered. Fish exist again and there are many plants near and in the water.

The underground water is severely polluted. As a result, water from local fountains is not drinkable. Especially in the villages that are upstream, people drink water from local public sources. In Rociu, water is pumped from 150 to 200 meters deep.
