= Rociu =

- Commune
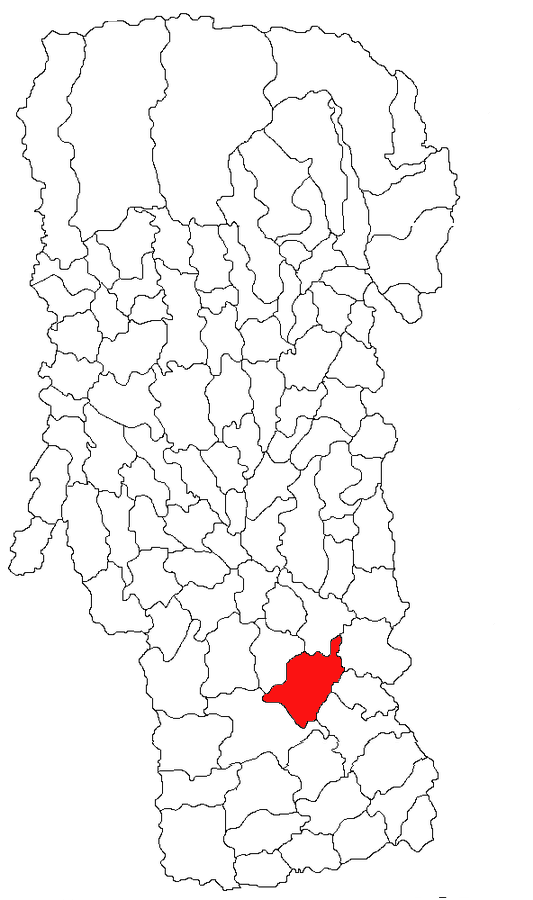
- Location in Argeș County

- Location in Romania
- Coordinates: 44°40′N 25°2′E
- Country: Romania
- County: Argeș

Government
  - Mayor (2021–2024): Victor-Mihai Bălășoiu (PSD)
- Area: 79.23 km^{2} (30.59 sq mi)
- Elevation: 227 m (745 ft)
- Population (2021-12-01): 2,298
  - Density: 29.00/km^{2} (75.12/sq mi)
- Time zone: UTC+02:00 (EET)
  - Summer (DST): UTC+03:00 (EEST)
- Postal code: 117625
- Area code: +(40) 248
- Vehicle reg.: AG
- Website: primariarociu.ro

Rociu is a commune in Argeș County, Muntenia, Romania. It is composed of four villages: Gliganu de Jos, Gliganu de Sus, Rociu, and Șerbănești.

== History ==
The oldest relics come from the Bronze Age, from Șerbănești village. Then, much later, the village Gliganu is mentioned, on June 12, 1564. The village belonged to a boyar from Rucăr. According to the same source, all four villages are mentioned after 1830. In the Communist period, the commune received a strong impulse for economic growth: A 25 km (16 mi) long irrigation canal was built to drain water from the Argeș River. Rociu received special attention because a farm of the Communist Party was built there.

== Location ==
Rociu is situated in the southern part of Argeș County, in the Găvanu-Burdea plains. It is situated 25 to 30 kilometres (16 to 19 mi) from the county seat, Pitești. The average altitude is 240 m (790 ft).

== Villages ==
There are 4 villages: Rociu, Gliganu de Jos, Gliganu de Sus, and Șerbănești.

Village	Distance to center	Population	Number of firms	References
Rociu	Center	662	17	
Gliganu de Jos	3 km West	637	8	
Gliganu de Sus	6 km North-West	971	8	
Șerbănești	8 km North	unknown	unknown	

== Geography ==
The Găvanu-Burdea plain is a flat region, with large and fertile valleys. Rociu is situated close to the Dâmbovnic River (sometimes called Drâmbovnic). There are a few smaller rivers that are dry in summer, such the Mozacu River and the Gliganu River. There are many small lakes, used for fishing.

=== Climate ===
Rociu has a temperate climate, like all Romanian villages. Usually, summers are hot and winters have frequent winds.

== Demographics ==
According to the 2002 census, the commune has 3014 people, of which 2968 are Romanians and 46 are Roma people. Also, the population is dramatically aged: 40% are older than 60 years, and children are only 12% of the total population. 99% are Orthodox.

== Transportation ==
There are a few county roads that link the commune with Pitești and the nearby villages:

1. DJ503 links Rociu with Oarja and the A1 Motorway. It is asphalted from the motorway to Rociu. The road continues South to Giurgiu, but it is unasphalted.
2. DJ659 links Rociu north with Suseni, Bradu, and Pitești and to the south it continues to Negrași, Videle and Giurgiu. It is asphalted.
3. DJ703b is unasphalted and links Rociu to Costești in the west and to Căteasca in the east.

The communal roads link the villages one to another:

1. DC104 links DJ659 (in Gliganu de Jos) with DJ 503 (in Rociu village) and then extends West to Căteasca. It is asphalted between Gliganu and Rociu.
2. DC106 links the centre of Rociu village with Șerbănești village and DJ659. It was recently asphalted.

== Economy ==
There are no major firms in the area. The main occupation is agriculture. There are two major agricultural companies, a few mills, a small pig farm, a paper factory and a lot of small markets and pubs that provide the population with daily goods. There is a fair every Tuesday. Since the economy is based on agriculture, the old irrigation canal might still be used. Today, it only brings water to local fishing lakes.

== Institutions ==
The town hall is located in the Rociu village. Near the town hall are the post office and the Veterinarian and Human services. Not far away is the politic centre, of the Social Democratic Party. There is a school and a church in each village.

== Environmental problems ==
Upstream, on the Dîmbovnic River, is an important oil refinery, the Arpechim Refinery. Since its construction, nearly all the toxic waste was released in the river. In 2005, the situation was so bad, that water in the fountains was no longer drinkable, even for animals. The only solution to provide water for the inhabitants and their animals was to use the deep freatic waters (about 200 meters deep) and to build an extensive system of water pipes to every house. Today, the river is only occasionally polluted and even fish have reappeared after more than 50 years.

== Tourism ==
Rociu is not a tourist destination and has no hotels or camp sites. However, not far away, in Negrași is a protected area, the Negrași Daffodil Meadow.

There is an old church in Șerbănești village, that is considered a touristic objective.

=== Unofficial resort? ===
The commune has multiple access routes (see #Transportation). Being situated more than 25 km (16 mi) from any big city, Rociu has very clean air. The water is pumped from 150 to 200 meters deep and is of very good quality (see #Environmental problems). According to the Argeș County police, violent incidents are very rare and there are no major conflicts. Houses and terrains can be found (to buy or to rent) at very small costs. All these facts create conditions for elderly people to come and settle in Rociu and nearby villages after they retire from work. This population migration partially explains the population dynamics mentioned above, in #Demographics.
