= Jirnov =

- Location within Romania

Location
- Country: Romania
- Counties: Argeș, Dâmbovița, Teleorman
- Villages: Glogoveanu, Sârbeni, Udeni, Gratia

Physical characteristics
- Mouth: Dâmbovnic
  - location: Ciurari-Deal
  - coordinates: 44.4333°N 25.4396°E
- Length: 43 km (27 mi)
- Basin size: 90 km^{2} (35 sq mi)

Basin features
- Progression: Dâmbovnic→ Neajlov→ Argeș→ Danube→ Black Sea

The Jirnov is a left tributary of the river Dâmbovnic in Romania. Its length is 43 km (27 mi) and its basin size is 90 km^{2} (35 sq mi). It flows into the Dâmbovnic in Gratia.
