= Mârșa =

- Commune
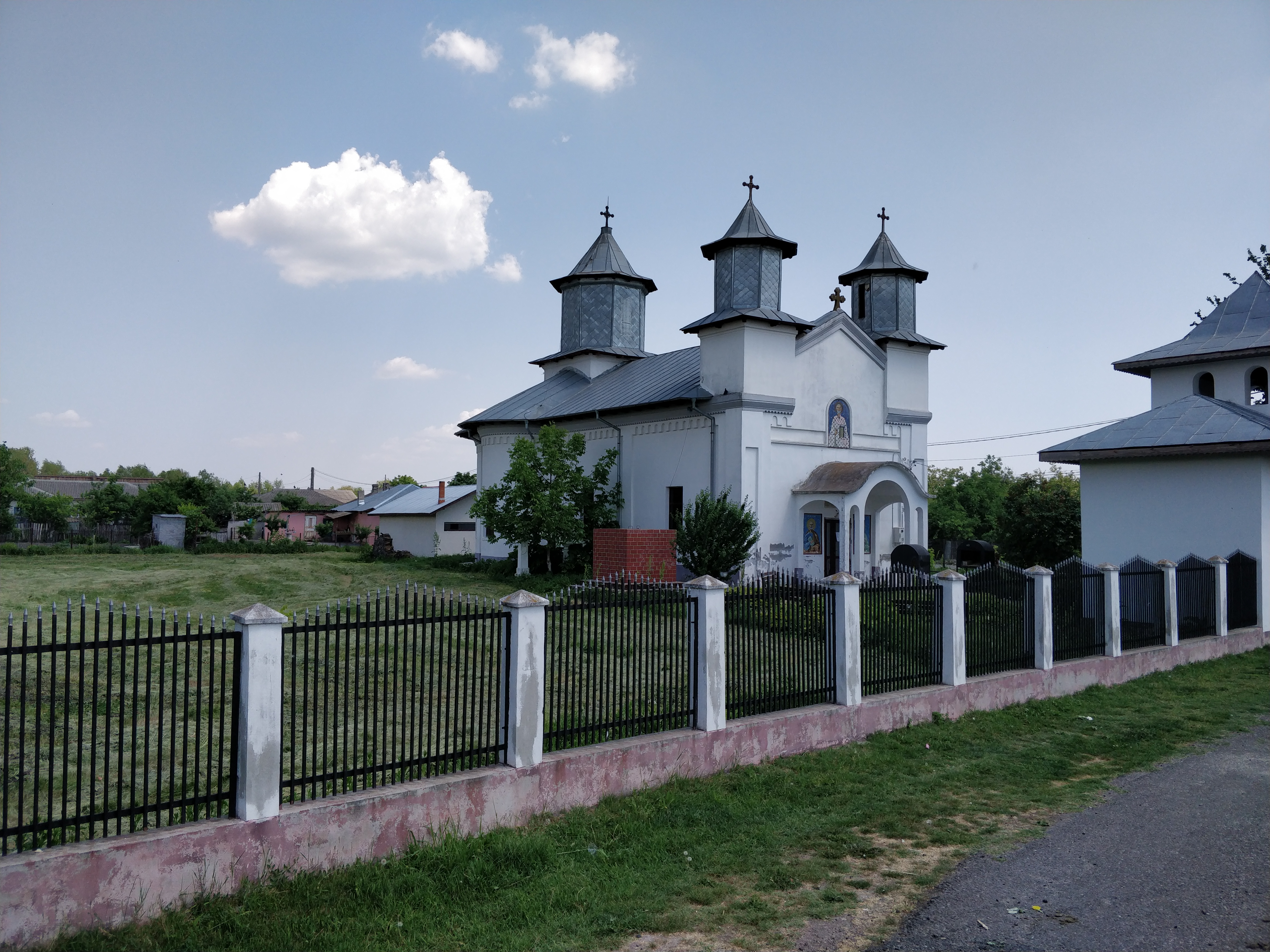
- St. Nicholas Church in Mârșa

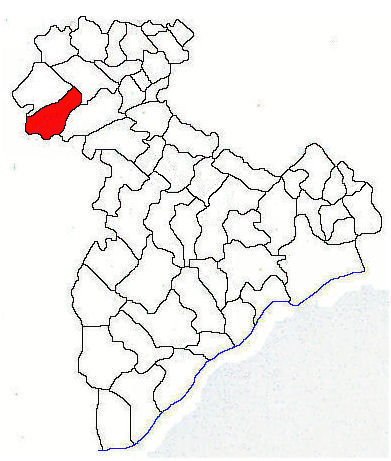
- Location in Giurgiu County

- Location in Romania
- Coordinates: 44°22′N 25°33′E
- Country: Romania
- County: Giurgiu

Government
  - Mayor (2024–2028): Virginia Drăgan (PNL)
- Area: 57.70 km^{2} (22.28 sq mi)
- Elevation: 97 m (318 ft)
- Population (2021-12-01): 2,646
  - Density: 45.86/km^{2} (118.8/sq mi)
- Time zone: UTC+02:00 (EET)
  - Summer (DST): UTC+03:00 (EEST)
- Postal code: 087160
- Area code: +(40) 246
- Vehicle reg.: GR
- Website: primariamarsa.ro

Mârșa is a commune located in north-west Giurgiu County, Muntenia, Romania. It is composed of a single village, Mârșa.

== History ==
The etymology is lost in time. The Romanian word mârșă, meaning "lure" or "bait", has probably nothing to do with the name origin.

According to 1901 edition of Marele Dicționar Geografic al Romîniei (English: Great Romanian Geographical Dictionary), Mârșa was in the 19th century a rural commune located on Drîmbovnic (nowadays Dâmbovnic) Valley, part of Neajlov District (Plasa Neajlov), Vlașca County. Also, former property of Bolintineanu family - the poet Dumitru Bolintineanu (a.k.a. Dimitrie Bolintineanu) being even born in there, Mârșa (Mîrșia) was later divided between Mîrșia-din-Deal (en: Mîrșia-On-the-Hill), property of R. Dumitriu (later dowry to C. Nacu) and Mîrșia-din-Vale (en: Mîrșia-On-the-Valley), property of Nicolae Cioflic (Note: interpreted from original record).

== Geography ==
The commune is situated in the Găvanu-Burdea Plain (part of Romanian Plain) on the right bank of Dâmbovnic river. It is crossed by the county road DJ601 linking Bucharest (45 km east) to Videle (10 km south).

=== Neighbours ===
North: Roata de Jos commune
East: Dâmbovnic river; farmland till Neajlov river
South-East: Goleasca village
South: Videle town
West: farmland till Teleorman County border

=== Natural resources ===
In the north side of village can be seen oil wells in exploitation. The farmland is good for field intensive crops if properly irrigated, especially in dry summers.

Historical population
| Year | Pop. | ±% |
|---|---|---|
| 2002 | 2,784 | — |
| 2011 | 2,742 | −1.5% |
| 2021 | 2,646 | −3.5% |
Source: Census data

== Awareness ==
=== National archaeological records ===
Tei settlement - civilian housing of Bronze Age (on the outskirts of the village, right side of Roata de Jos road, north of Gitonei Valley)
Dridu settlement - civilian housing of Medieval times – 8th century AD (on the outskirts of the village, right side of Goleasca road)

=== Historic buildings ===
- Orthodox Church Sf. Nicolae (~ 1890)
- Manor House N. Cioflic - later "Oscar Han" (1850)
- Manor House Dr. Lazarovici - known today as dispensary (19th century)

=== School ===
For many years, the school of Mârșa (Școala Generală) has prepared and sent its graduates to next level schools, mainly - but not limited - to Videle, Bolintin-Vale, Bucharest, most of them becoming reliable intellectuals. Radu G. Țeposu (1954–1999), literary critic, essayist and literary columnist representative in the eighties, has been assigned as a Romanian Language and Literature teacher to Mârșa school, where he worked during 1978-1983.

=== Music ===
Representatives of Vlașca's traditional folk music (muzica lăutărească), local fiddlers (lăutari) survived over time, perhaps because they are musicians from father to son.

== Traditions ==
=== Ignatul ===
December 20 represents the starting day for traditional pig slaughter (Tăiatul Porcului) ending on Christmas Eve. The householder himself or a hired skilled neighbor will carry out the entire job, starting early in the morning. Everywhere in the village can be heard the scream of pigs. It takes three to four men to drag out from shelter and put down the animal. The skilled butcher stabs directly the pig's heart with a long sharp knife, for a quick death without suffering. The corpse is left a few minutes for blood draining. Meanwhile, the householder will treat the men who helped him with a cup of home-made brandy (țuică) or wine, preferably hot, thanking them for their help. After that, the pig's body will be cleaned and covered with straws. The pig's entire skin hair will be burned until the skin is cooked enough, all around. While cleaning and washing is done by pouring hot water, the skin is grated using knives, even bricks or simply tin cans, punctured with a nail. At this stage, the skin (șorici) becomes eatable - fresh or slightly salted. Then the hooves are plucked and the body is placed with back on top. A cross sign is cut on pig's back and filled with salt. The housewife is incensing all over and everybody is praying God for food blessing. Only after this moment, the meat can be cut to be kept raw in salt, dried or smoked, or to be prepared using various traditional recipes and kept dried or smoked or even fried in the melted pig's fat. At the end, the householder prepares a meal of pork for those who helped him, this custom being known as Pomana Porcului.

=== Colindețele ===
On the morning of December 24, children sing this specific carol at the house's door or window: Foicică portocală / Noi suntem copii de școală / Și-am venit sa colindăm / Pe la case sa urăm / Bună dimineața la Moș Ajun! / Și-am venit si noi o dată / La un an cu sănătate / Maica Domnului sa ne-ajute / La covrigi și la nuci multe / Bună dimineața la Moș Ajun! / Ne dați ori nu ne dați?! / Că de noi nu mai scăpați! The hosts usually reward them with pretzels, nuts, apples and sweets.

=== Steaua ===
This Christian carol is performed for three consecutive evenings, starting Christmas Eve. Children use a decorated star shape (steaua) to perform it, usually at the house's window. The lyrics may vary, sometimes last part being altered by custom lyrics or from other carols: Câte flori sunt pe pământ / Toate merg la jurământ / Numai floarea crinului / Șade-n Poarta Raiului / Și judecă florile / Florile, garoafele / De le ia miroasele. / Dete-o ploaie și un vânt / De le culcă la pământ / Dete-o ploaie și un soare / De le scoală în picioare. The hosts usually reward the children with money.

=== Bicele ===
This carol is very similar to Pluguşorul, but in a shorter version. Village boys crack their whips (bicele) on the New Year's Eve. They go from house to house asking for hosts' consent to perform inside the house's yard: La anu' și la mulți ani! Primiți bicele? They receive money rewards from the hosts.

=== Vasîlca ===
Adult gypsies, using an adorned pig head placed on a tray, perform this carol on New Year's Eve or Saint Basil's Day - January 1. They can receive food, wine or money as reward.

=== Sorcova ===
On January 1, the children use a stick decorated with colorful paper flowers to pat the adults' shoulder while performing the classical blessing carol. They are usually rewarded with money.

=== Plugușorul ===
Nowadays, accompanied by decorated tractors, the men perform the Plugușorul tradition and carol on the first day of January, throughout the whole village or only in a dedicated area, if there are many groups. The lyrics may vary from traditional text.

=== Mărțișorul ===
It is a talisman tied with red and white twisted thread usually offered to women on March 1, sometimes along with greetings and flowers.

=== Babele ===
According to tradition, by picking one day from first to ninth of March, a woman can determine her mood throughout the year, depending on that particular day's weather. It starts with Mărțișorul and ends with Măcinicii.

=== Măcinicii ===
This is the Christian feast of the 40 Martyrs of Sebaste, on March 9. The housewives will prepare a specific dessert, by cooking "8" shaped pasta in water, adding sugar, crushed nuts, cinnamon powder and grated lemon. The custom says that they must share this special dish with the community. Until the end of day, men must drink 40 glasses of wine to honor the sacrifice of the 40 martyrs. Because this day it coincides with the start of the agricultural year, the householders will clean their households and burn collected garbage.

=== Moșii ===
This tradition is very old and nowadays it coincides with the Saturday (Sâmbăta Morților) before Rusalii (Whitsuntide equivalent). It is the commemoration day of the dead elders (moșii) and it continues a tradition inherited probably from Dacians. The housewives prepare clay dishes (străchini), filled with sweet milk boiled rice (local tradition - colarezi), boiled eggs, some sweets and cherries or strawberries, and clay pots, filled with water (or wine) and garden flowers, sharing them with neighbors, relatives and the needy.

=== Călușul ===
Part of Muntenia's Călușari tradition, the local show includes also the mute character (Mutu) who does not speak, wears a hideous mask and does obscene actions.

=== Paparuda ===
This is a ritual dance performed in times of severe drought to invoke rain. It is performed by a group of young girls, one being adorned with flowers and leaves and sprayed with water. They are singing: "Paparudă, rudă / Vino de ne udă..."
