= Zidurile =

Zidurile may refer to several villages in Romania:

- Zidurile, a village in Mozăceni Commune, Argeș County
- Zidurile, a village in Odobești Commune, Dâmbovița County
