= Dacian fortress of Herneacova =

- Location within Romania
- 45.878°N 21.486°E
- Cultures: Late Hallstatt, La Tène
- Location: Cetate, Herneacova, Timiș, Romania

Site notes
- Area: 5 ha (12 acres)
- Excavation dates: 2003–06
- Archaeologists: Florin Medeleț
- Discovered: 1971
- Condition: Ruined

Monument istoric
- Reference no.: TM-I-s-A-06062

It is an earthen fortification located some 3 km north from the village of Herneacova, Timiș County, Romania. The site known locally as Cetate ("Fortress") or Cetatea turcească ("Turkish fortress") consists of a hillock fortified by a system consisting of three moats and two ramparts. The route of one of the ramparts is partially used today as a country road, between Sălciua Nouă and Herneacova. The archeological surveys carried out by Florin Medeleț in 1971 highlighted a fortress of refuge that dominated the valley of the Bencec stream and that functioned at the end of the first Iron Age and the 3rd–4th centuries AD, respectively. The defensive system surrounds an area of about 5 ha.
