= 1st Anti-Aircraft Brigade =

1st Anti-Aircraft Brigade, 1st Anti-Aircraft Artillery Brigade or 1st Antiaircraft Artillery Brigade may refer to:

- 1st Anti-Aircraft Brigade, Royal Garrison Artillery, United Kingdom (1914 – 1920)
- 1st Anti-Aircraft Brigade (United Kingdom) (1920 –1955)

== See also ==
- 1st Surface to Air Missiles Brigade (Romania)
- 1st Brigade (disambiguation)
