= BRUA pipeline =

Natural gas pipeline in Romania

Location
- Country: Romania
- Direction: east–west
- Start: Podișor, Giurgiu County
- Passes through: Romania
- To: Recaș, Timiș County

General information
- Type: natural gas
- Partners: Transgaz
- Operator: Transgaz
- Expected: 2019

Technical information
- Length: 479 km (298 mi)
- Maximum discharge: 4.4 billion cubic meters (0.15 Tcf) per year
- Diameter: 32 in (813 mm)

The BRUA pipeline is a natural gas pipeline from Podișor, Giurgiu County to Recaș, Timiș County part of the future Bulgaria, Romania, Hungary and Austria gas interconnector. The pipeline attempts to lessen the country's dependence on Russian energy and provide a new export route for the future natural gas exploitation in the Black Sea. The BRUA pipeline will be eventually linked to the Giurgiu–Ruse and the Arad–Szeged pipelines.

Preparations for the project started in 2016, the financing agreements were signed in 2017 and the actual construction phase kicked off in the first quarter of 2018. The project is developed by Transgaz, the technical operator of the national natural gas transmission system in Romania. The first phase of the pipeline was completed in 2020 at a cost of €423 million and the pipeline is operational since June 2023.

== History ==
The agreement for the construction of the BRUA pipeline was signed on November 28, 2017, at a total cost of €479 million. Financing for the first phase is provided by a European Commission grant of €180 million, a €50 million European Investment Bank loan and a European Bank for Reconstruction and Development loan of €60 million. The pipeline is supposed to be inaugurated in two phases in 2019 and 2022.

== Technical description ==
The length of the pipeline will be 479 kilometres (298 mi) and the construction will start on three different sections in early 2018. The general contractor of the first two sections is the Austrian company Habau and the third section is contracted by the Romanian company INSPET. The 32 inches (810 mm) BRUA pipeline will cross 79 administrative units in 11 counties, and will include new gas compressor stations at Podișor, Bibești and Jupa and the final transport capacity will be 4.4 billion cubic meter (bcm) of natural gas per annum. The total cost of the pipeline is around €479 million.
