= Adunații =

Adunații may refer to several places in Romania:

- Adunații-Copăceni, a commune in Giurgiu County
- Adunații Teiului, a village in Tâmna Commune, Mehedinți County
- Adunații Sârbeni, the former name for Sârbeni Commune, Teleorman County

== See also ==
- Adunați, a commune in Prahova County, Romania
