= Gligan =

- Location within Romania

Location
- Country: Romania
- Counties: Argeș County
- Villages: Gliganu de Sus, Gliganu de Jos

Physical characteristics
- Mouth: Dâmbovnic
  - location: Gliganu de Jos
  - coordinates: 44.6468°N 25.0647°E
- Length: 19 km (12 mi)
- Basin size: 34 km^{2} (13 sq mi)

Basin features
- Progression: Dâmbovnic→ Neajlov→ Argeș→ Danube→ Black Sea

The Gligan is a right tributary of the river Dâmbovnic in Romania. It flows through Gliganu de Jos, a village in Rociu commune. The Gligan flows into the Dâmbovnic upstream from the confluence with the Mozacu. Its length is 19 km (12 mi) and its basin size is 34 km^{2} (13 sq mi).
