= Tuțulești =

Tuţuleşti may refer to several places in Romania:

- Ţuţuleşti, a village in Suseni Commune, Argeș County
- Tuţuleşti, a village in Racoviţa Commune, Vâlcea County
