= Bârlogu =

Bârlogu may refer to several villages in Romania:

- Bârlogu, a village in Negrași Commune, Argeș County
- Bârlogu, a village in Stoenești, Vâlcea
