= Ghiță Licu =

Romanian handball player (1945–2014)

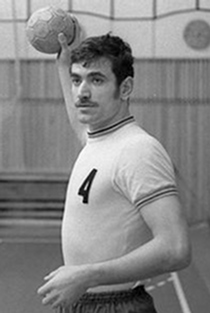

Personal information
- Born: 1 December 1945 Fierbinți, Romania
- Died: 8 April 2014
- Height: 186 cm (6 ft 1 in)
- Weight: 92 kg (203 lb)

Sport
- Sport: Handball
- Club: Dinamo Bucharest (1964–1980)
Medal record
Representing Romania
Olympic Games
Bronze medal – third place	1972 Munich	Team
Silver medal – second place	1976 Montreal	Team
World Championship
Bronze medal – third place	1967 Sweden	Team
Gold medal – first place	1970 France	Team
Gold medal – first place	1974 East Germany	Team

Gheorghe "Ghiță" Licu (1 December 1945 – 8 April 2014) was a Romanian handball pivot player. Between 1966 and 1976 he capped 197 times for the national team and scored 328 goals, winning world titles in 1970 and 1974 and Olympic medals in 1972 and 1976. Domestically he played his entire career from 1964 to 1980 for Dinamo Bucuresti, winning the national titles in 1965, 1966 and 1978 and the Romanian Cup in 1979. After retiring from competitions Licu became a handball coach. In 1980–1993 he worked with Dinamo Bucuresti in Romania, and in 1995–2006 with SC Magdeburg in Germany, first with the junior and then with the senior team, leading them to the German national title in 2001 and the EHF Champions League victory in 2002. His son Robert also became an Olympic handball player and coach.
