= Recaș Wineries =

Recaș Wineries (Romanian: Cramele Recaș) is a winery located in Recaș, Timiș County, Romania.

Established in 1991, the company was Romania's leading wine producer by 2018, with a turnover of €38 million. Additionally, it was the country's top exporter, sending half its output abroad.

The winery has an annual production capacity of 32 million liters. Its grapes grow on 1150 hectares in Recaș and Miniș. The grapes are in 25 varieties, producing 45 brands.
