= Bucșani, Giurgiu =

Bucșani
- Commune
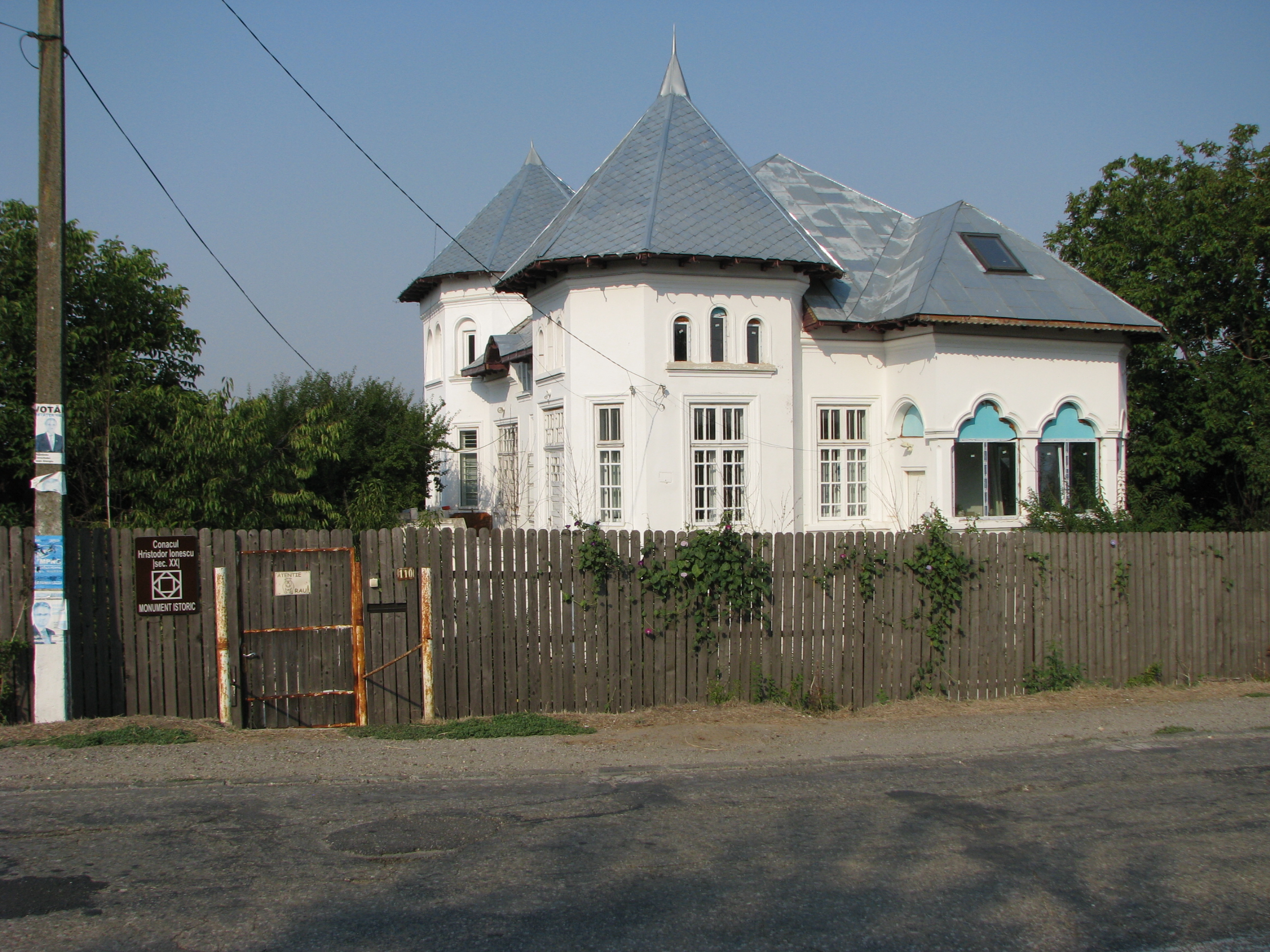
- Hristodor Ionescu Manor in Bucșani

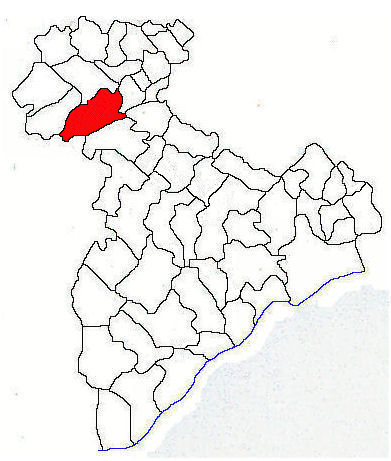
- Location in Giurgiu County

- Location in Romania
- Coordinates: 44°20′41″N 25°40′20″E
- Country: Romania
- County: Giurgiu
- Subdivisions: Anghelești, Bucșani, Goleasca, Obedeni, Podișor, Uiești, Vadu Lat

Government
  - Mayor (2020–2024): Dan Păsat (Ind.)
- Area: 86.2 km^{2} (33.3 sq mi)
- Elevation: 90 m (300 ft)
- Population (2021-12-01): 3,462
  - Density: 40.2/km^{2} (104/sq mi)
- Time zone: UTC+02:00 (EET)
  - Summer (DST): UTC+03:00 (EEST)
- Postal code: 087027
- Area code: +(40) x46
- Vehicle reg.: GR
- Website: primariabucsanigiurgiu.ro

Bucșani is a commune located in Giurgiu County, Muntenia, Romania. It is composed of seven villages: Anghelești, Bucșani, Goleasca, Obedeni, Podișor, Uiești, and Vadu Lat.

== Geography ==
The commune is situated in the Wallachian Plain, at an altitude of 90 m (300 ft), on the banks of the rivers Dâmbovnic and Ilfovăț. It is located in the northern part of Giurgiu County, 130 km (81 mi) north of the county seat, Giurgiu, on the border with Teleorman County. The city of Bucharest is 70 km (43 mi) to the southeast, while Târgoviște is 20 km (12 mi) to the northwest and Ploiești is 38 km (24 mi) to the east.

The Vadu Lat and Anghelești train stations serve the CFR Main Line 900, which connects Bucharest with the western city of Timișoara.

== Economy ==
The Bucșani Solar Park is a large thin-film photovoltaic power system, built on a 24 ha (59 acres) plot of land in the commune. The solar park is projected to extend over a surface of 130 ha (320 acres), reaching a production capacity of 130MW by 2027.

The BRUA pipeline is a natural gas pipeline from Podișor to Recaș, Timiș County, part of the planned Bulgaria, Romania, Hungary, and Austria gas interconnector. The pipeline is projected to extend to Tuzla, 308.3 km (191.6 mi) to the east, on the Black Sea seashore, thereby connecting the gas extracted from the Neptun Deep gas field to the BRUA corridor.

The 112th SAM Battalion of the 1st Surface to Air Missiles Brigade is also located in Bucșani.

== Villages ==
=== Vadu Lat ===
Vadu Lat (sometimes spelled Vadul-Lat) is a village in Bucșani commune. The village has a middle school and a psychiatric hospital. One of the most important employers in the county is Baza Vadu Lat (a small storehouse that buys the crops from farmers in the region). The society was listed on the RASDAQ Exchange until 2002. It is now owned by Cargill.

In antiquity, this area was the home of the Gumelnița Culture.

Historical population
Year	Pop.	±%
2002	4,023	—
2011	3,906	−2.9%
2021	3,462	−11.4%
Source: Census data

== Natives ==
- Stelian Badea (born 1958), footballer
- Ilie Nițu (born 1931), sports shooter
- Constantin Zamfir (1951–2025), footballer
