= Negrași Daffodil Meadow =

Romanian nature reserve

- Poiana cu narcise Negrași
- Location within Romania
- Location: Argeș County, Muntenia, Romania
- Nearest city: Negrași
- Coordinates: 44°36′05″N 25°08′37″E
- Area: 4.3 ha (11 acres)
- Established: 1966

The Negrași Daffodil Meadow (Romanian: Poiana cu narcise Negrași) is a protected area near Negrași Commune, in Argeș County, Muntenia, Romania. It was declared as a natural reservation on June 24, 1966.

== Position and accessibility ==
The Daffodil Meadow is situated in the southern part of Argeș County, in the Găvanu-Burdea Plains, near the confluence of Dâmbovnic River and its tributary, Mozacu. It is a remote, unpolluted area. It is located at 40 km (25 mi) from Piteşti, in the area of Negrași Commune, at about 12 km (7.5 mi) from Rociu. The access route is the county road DJ503. It is usually closed in winter.

== Natural Reservation ==
The reservation has 4.3 hectares (11 acres) and protects a rare daffodil, Narcissus poeticus, ssp. Radiiflorus.

== Local importance ==
Every May 13, a daffodil festival is held in Negrași.
