= Elek Schwartz =

Romanian footballer and manager (1908–2000)

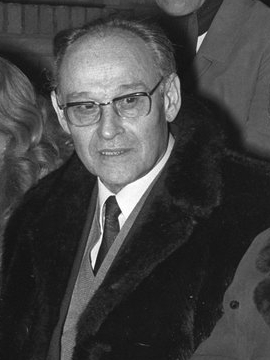
- Schwartz in 1972

Personal information
- Full name: Alexandru Schwartz
- Date of birth: 23 October 1908
- Place of birth: Temesrékas, Austria-Hungary (today Recaş, Romania)
- Date of death: 2 October 2000 (aged 91)
- Place of death: Haguenau, France
- Height: 1.78 m (5 ft 10 in)
- Position: Defender

Senior career*
Years	Team	Apps	(Gls)
1926–1930	Kadima Timișoara		
1930–1932	CA Timişoara		
1932–1934	Hyères FC		
1934–1936	Cannes	53	(0)
1936–1938	Strasbourg	57	(0)
1938–1939	Red Star Olympique		

International career
1931–1932	Romania B	2	(0)

Managerial career
- 1948–1949: Cannes
- 1950–1952: Monaco
- 1952–1953: Le Havre
- 1953–1955: SF Hamborn 07
- 1955–1957: Rot-Weiss Essen
- 1957–1964: Netherlands
- 1964–1965: Benfica
- 1965–1968: Eintracht Frankfurt
- 1969–1970: Porto
- 1970–1971: Dordrecht
- 1971–1972: Sparta Rotterdam
- 1972–1973: 1860 Munich
- 1976–1977: Strasbourg
- 1978–1979: SR Haguenau
- * Club domestic league appearances and goals

Alexandru "Elek" Schwartz (23 October 1908 – 2 October 2000) was a Romanian professional footballer and coach of the Netherlands national team. With S.L. Benfica he won the national Championship and Cup trophies of 1965 and led the club into the final of the European Champion Clubs' Cup.

== Playing career ==
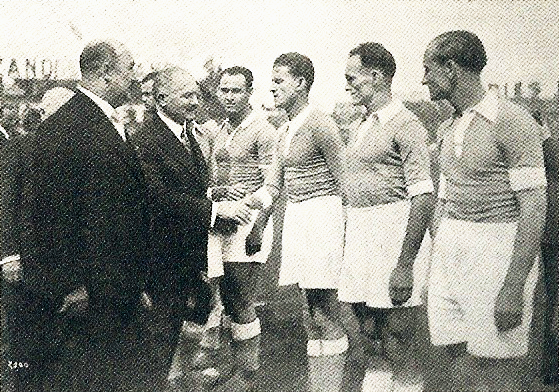
Schwartz was Coupe de France finalist with RC Strasbourg in 1937.

Elek Schwartz initially started playing near his hometown Recaş, in Timişoara. Later he played professional football in the French Ligue 1 with FC Hyères (1932–1934), AS Cannes (1934–36), Racing Strasbourg (1936–38) and Red Star Olympique (1938–39).

== Coaching career ==
=== Beginnings as coach on the Côte d'Azur ===
He started his coaching career in France with AS Cannes (1948–49) and from there continued to AS Monaco (1950–1952) and Le Havre AC (1952–53).

=== Early years in West Germany ===
In 1953 he was hired by SF Hamborn 07. In his second season with the club from the suburb of Duisburg he led the club to promotion to the western division of the five ways split first division of Germany, the Oberliga West.

In 1955, he was appointed as manager by then German champions, Rot-Weiss Essen coaching among others Helmut Rahn there. In the next couple of years he led the team to ranks 4 and 8 in the Oberliga West.

=== Manager of the Netherlands national team ===
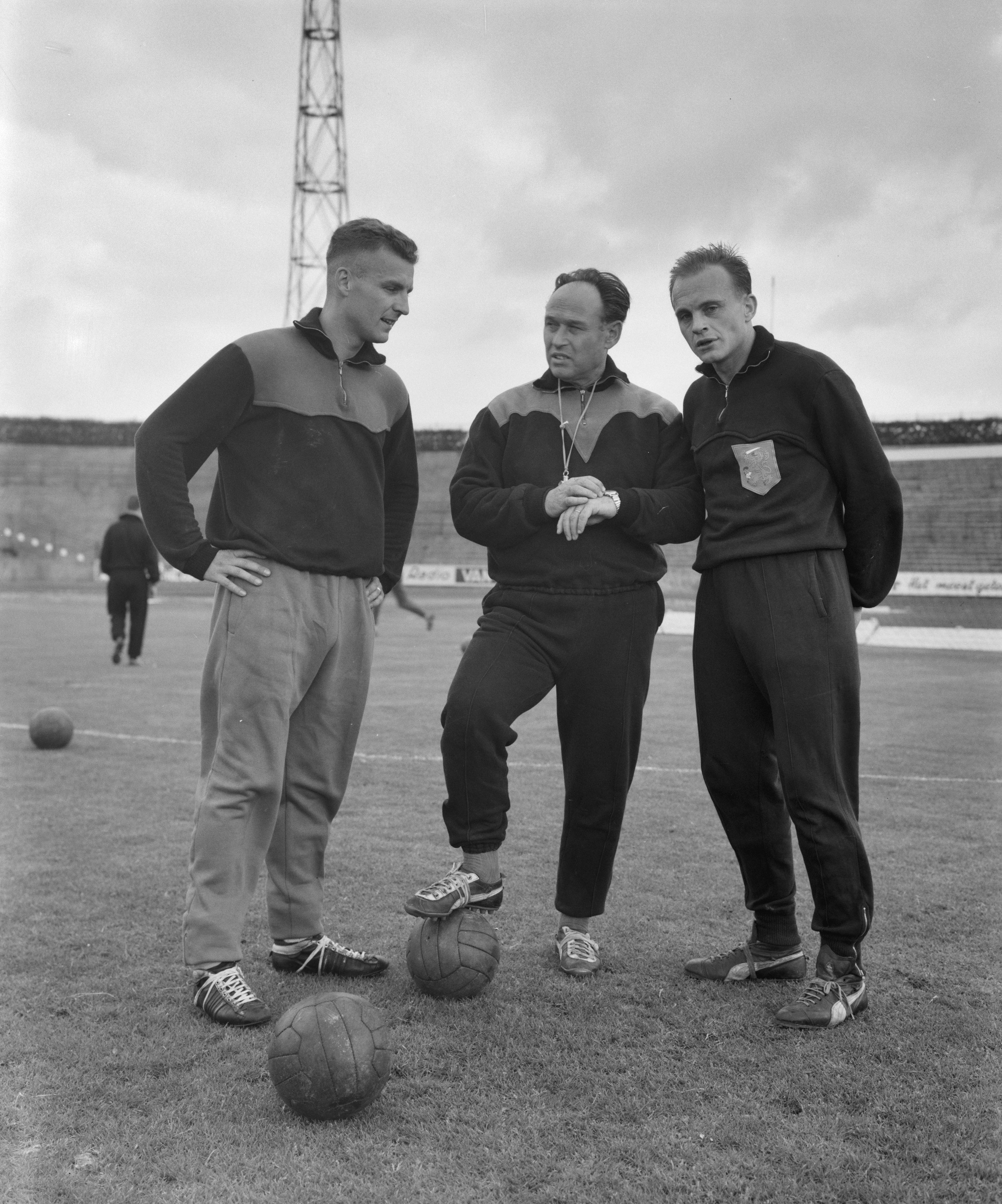
Schwartz (middle) as manager of the Netherlands in 1961

After leaving Rot-Weiss Essen, Schwartz joined the Netherlands football association, the KNVB and took on the reins of the Netherlands national football team. He guided the team through 49 matches.

However, this was in an era when Dutch football had yet to achieve the standing it has held since the 1970s. Results varied extremely and included 7–0 defeat to Germany in 1959 in Cologne, as well as back to back 1–0 wins against France and world champions Brazil in 1963. He held the position of national coach until 1964, when Denis Neville replaced him.

=== European Cup Final with Benfica ===
In 1964–65, he coached Portuguese club S.L. Benfica, then with Eusébio. There he led them to their first third-consecutive league title.

After this, Benfica overcame Real Madrid in the quarterfinals of the European Cup of Champions and eventually even made it all the way to the final, where Benfica had to yield to the masters of the Catenaccio, the Helenio Herrera coached team of Inter Milan, who won 1–0, thus failing what would be Benfica's third European Cup title.

=== Bundesliga with Eintracht Frankfurt and FC Porto spell ===
From July 1965 to June 1968 Schwartz coached – as successor to Ivica Horvat – Eintracht Frankfurt in the German Bundesliga. There he introduced the 4–2–4 system. Nevertheless, place 4 was as good as it got in the league. During the 1966–67 season he won the International Football Cup and the Coppa delle Alpi. In the same year he led his side to the semifinals of the Inter-Cities Fairs Cup.

In 1969–70, he coached FC Porto. Not only that the Dragons exited already in the first round of the national cup competition and in the second round of the Inter-Cities Fairs Cup – in the end Porto was only ninth in the league, the club's worst finishing ever.

=== End of the career in Munich and Strasbourg ===
In the 1972–73 season, Schwartz coached TSV 1860 Munich, but he could not help them to fulfill their aspirations to return to the Bundesliga after then three years of absence.

He had more luck in 1976–77, when in the course of his last professional engagement he led Racing Strasbourg to promotion to the French Ligue 1.

After this he guided the Alsatian amateur side SR Haguenau, today's FCSR Haguenau, through the 1978–79 season.

Haguenau, he decided, was also a nice place for him to spend the rest of his life.

=== Tribute ===
In 1996, he was invited by the Royal Dutch Football Association to the inauguration of the Amsterdam Arena.
