= Chitila =

- Town
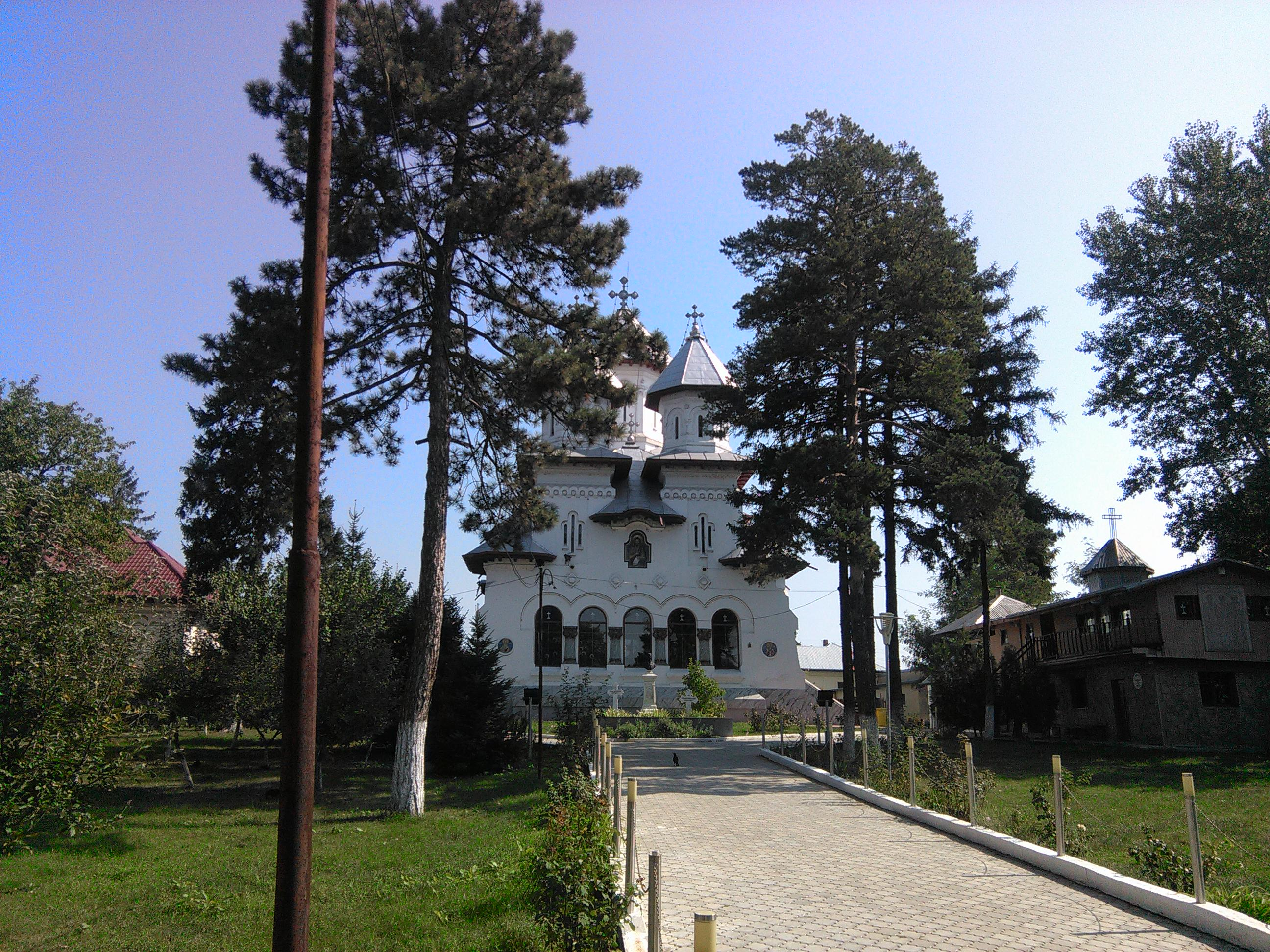
- Saint John the Baptist Church in Chitila

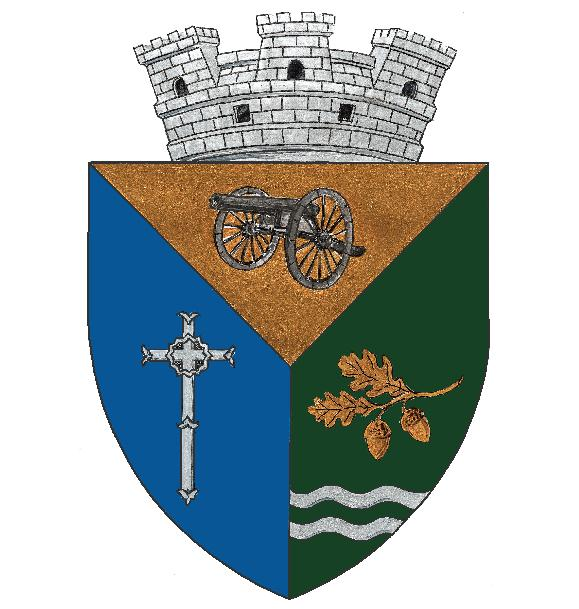
- Coat of arms

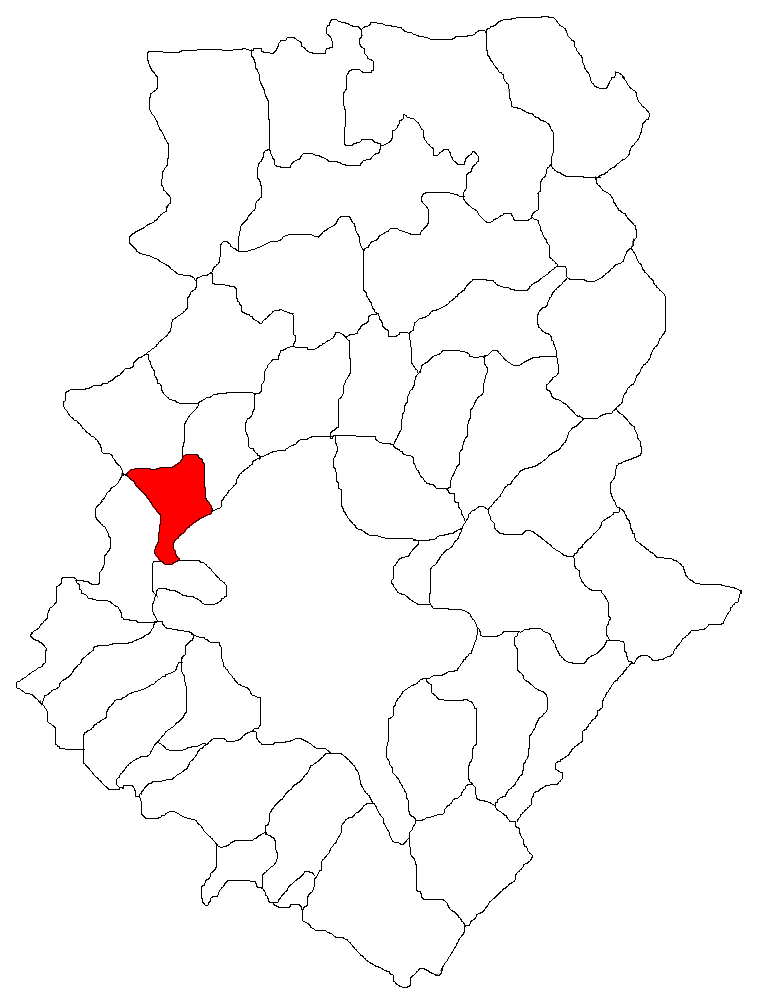
- Location in Ilfov County

- Location in Romania
- Coordinates: 44°30′30″N 25°58′55″E
- Country: Romania
- County: Ilfov

Government
  - Mayor (2024–2028): Emilian Oprea (PNL)
- Area: 12.54 km^{2} (4.84 sq mi)
- Elevation: 94 m (308 ft)
- Population (2021-12-01): 14,762
  - Density: 1,177/km^{2} (3,049/sq mi)
- Time zone: UTC+02:00 (EET)
  - Summer (DST): UTC+03:00 (EEST)
- Postal code: 077045
- Area code: (+40) 02 1
- Vehicle reg.: IF
- Website: primariachitila.ro

Chitila (Romanian pronunciation: [kiˈtila]) is a town in the west of Ilfov County, Muntenia, Romania, situated 9 km (5.6 mi) to the north-west of Bucharest. It is often seen as a satellite town of Bucharest. One village, Rudeni, is administered by the town.

Historical population
| Year | Pop. | ±% |
|---|---|---|
| 2002 | 12,643 | — |
| 2011 | 13,229 | +4.6% |
| 2021 | 14,762 | +11.6% |
Source: Census data

== Transport ==
Chitila is linked to Bucharest by two bus routes (r476 and r429 run by Ecotrans STCM). The Chitila railway station serves two of the CFR main railway lines emanating from Bucharest: Lines 500 and 300, going to Ploiești and Târgoviște.

== Natives ==
- Teohari Georgescu (1908–1976), Communist politician

== Other ==
The Romanian 1st Surface to Air Missiles Brigade has its headquarters in Chitila.
