= Mozacu =

- Location within Romania

Location
- Country: Romania
- Counties: Argeș County
- Villages: Teiu, Leșile, Mozacu

Physical characteristics
- Mouth: Dâmbovnic
  - location: Babaroaga
  - coordinates: 44.5524°N 25.1934°E
- Length: 40 km (25 mi)
- Basin size: 101 km^{2} (39 sq mi)

Basin features
- Progression: Dâmbovnic→ Neajlov→ Argeș→ Danube→ Black Sea

The Mozacu is a left tributary of the river Dâmbovnic in Romania. Its length is 40 km (25 mi) and its basin size is 101 km^{2} (39 sq mi). It discharges into the Dâmbovnic in Babaroaga.
