= Bucșani Solar Park =

Photovoltaic power stations in Romania

- Country: Romania
- Location: Bucșani
- Coordinates: 44°20′41″N 25°40′20″E
- Status: Completed
- Commission date: 2013
- Construction cost: €15 million
- Owner: Tinmar

Solar farm
- Type: Flat-panel PV

Power generation
- Units operational: 41,624
- Nameplate capacity: 10 MW
- Annual net output: 18 GWh

Bucșani Solar Park is a large thin-film photovoltaic (PV) power system, built on a 24 ha (59 acres) plot of land located in Bucșani in Romania. The solar park has around 41,624 state-of-the-art thin film PV panels for a total nameplate capacity of 10-megawatts, and was finished in December 2013. The solar park is expected to supply around 18 GWh of electricity per year enough to power some 19,700 average homes.

The installation is located in the Giurgiu County in southern Romania in Bucșani. The investment cost for the Bucșani solar park amounts to some Euro 15 million.

== See also ==
- Energy policy of the European Union
- Photovoltaics
- Renewable energy commercialization
- Renewable energy in the European Union
- Solar power in Romania
