= Plugușorul =

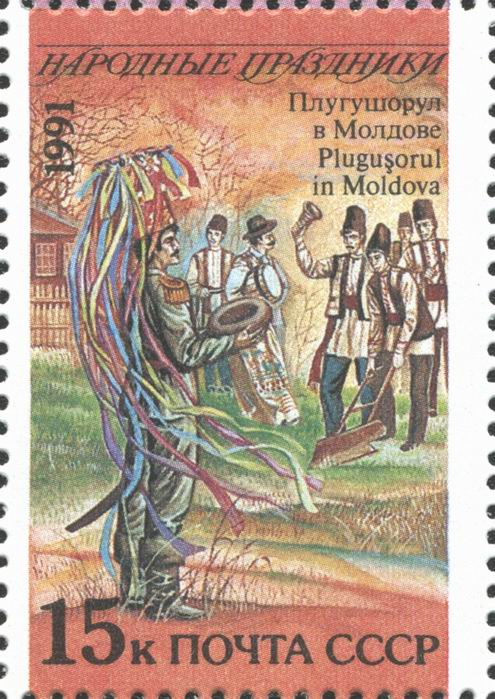
Plugușorul in Moldova

Plugușorul (Plowing is symbolic, Romanian: Plugușorul) is a Romanian New Year's tradition and carol.

Plugușor literally means "little plough" in Romanian, "-ul" being enclitic definite article.

== See also ==
- Plough Monday
- Colindă
- Mârșa
- Christmas in Romania
- List of Christmas carols

== See also ==
- Plugușor de la Moldova (youtube.com)
