= Oarja =

- Commune
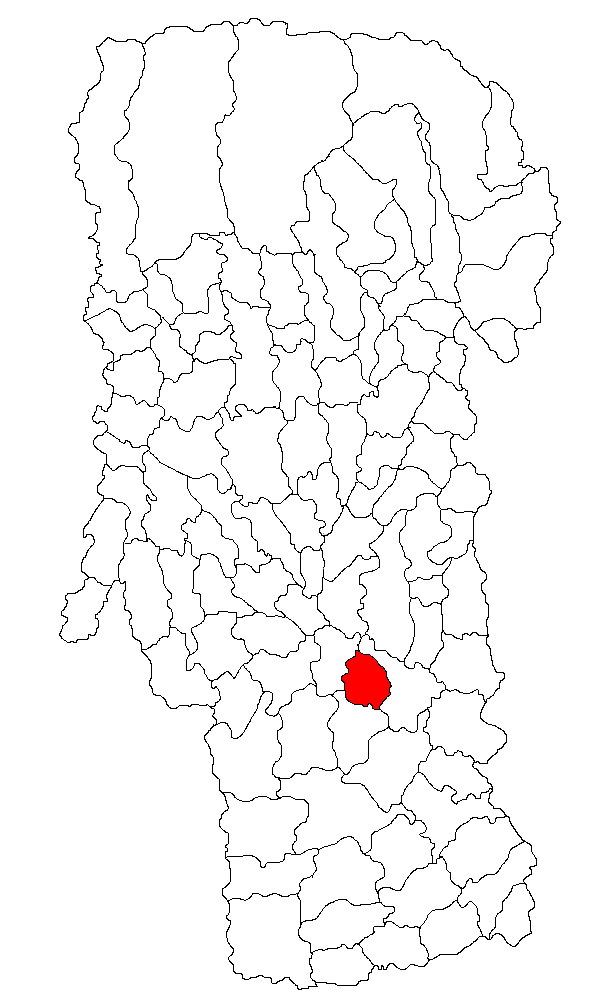
- Oarja within Argeș County

- Location in Romania
- Coordinates: 44°46′N 24°58′E
- Country: Romania
- County: Argeș

Government
  - Mayor (2020–2024): Constantin Bâlea (PSD)
- Area: 38.57 km^{2} (14.89 sq mi)
- Elevation: 267 m (876 ft)
- Population (2021-12-01): 2,692
  - Density: 70/km^{2} (180/sq mi)
- Time zone: EET/EEST (UTC+2/+3)
- Postal code: 117545, 117546
- Area code: +(40) 248
- Vehicle reg.: AG
- Website: www.cjarges.ro/en/web/oarja

Oarja is a commune in Argeș County, Muntenia, Romania. It is composed of two villages, Ceaușești and Oarja.

The commune is situated in the Wallachian Plain, at an altitude of 267 m (876 ft), on the banks of the rivers Neajlov and Mozacu. It is located in the central part of Argeș County, 16 km (9.9 mi) southeast of the county seat, Pitești.
