= 1st Surface to Air Missiles Brigade =

1st Surface to Air Missiles Brigade "General Nicolae Dăscălescu"
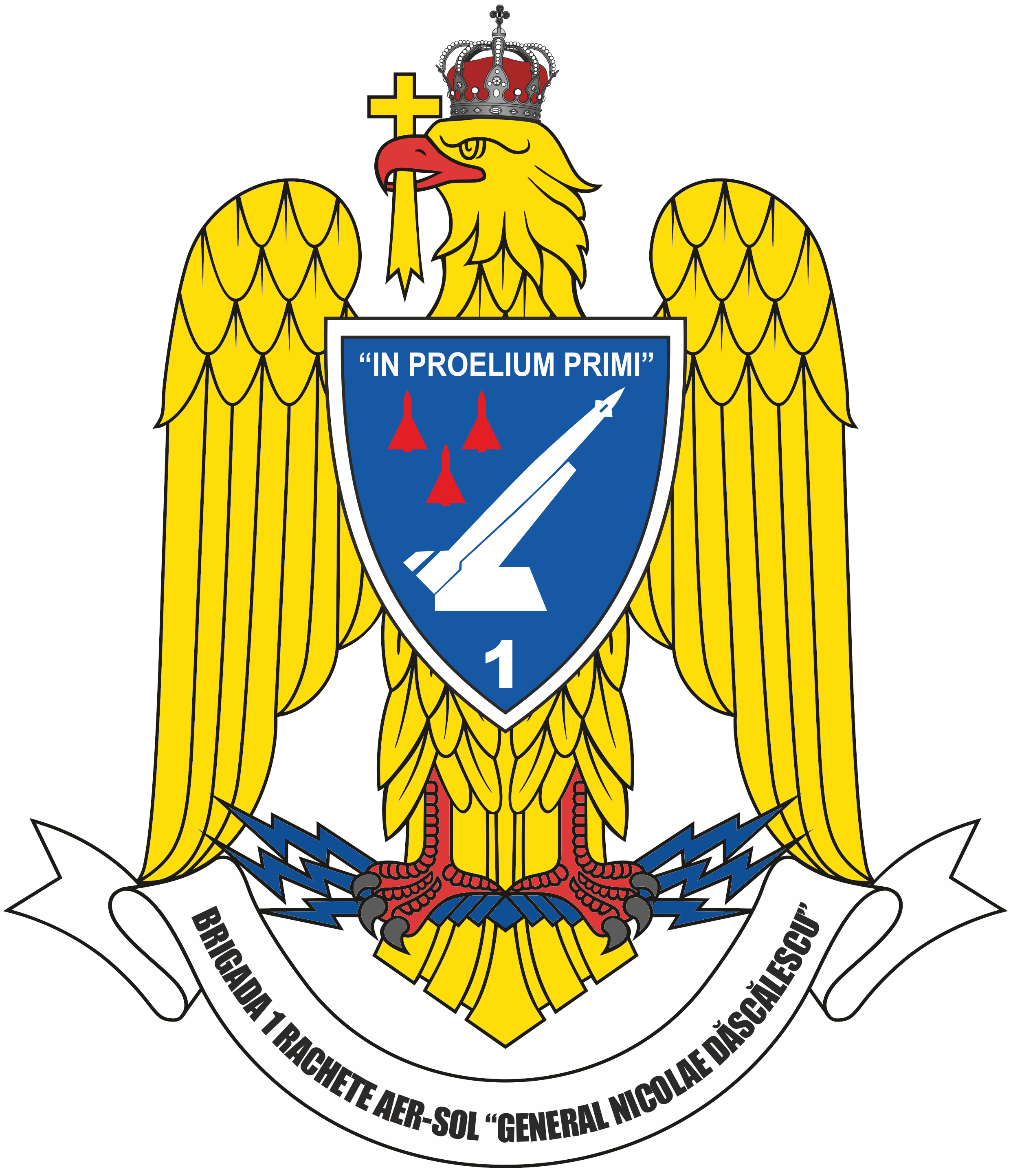
- Official emblem of the 1st SAM Brigade
- Active: 1973–Present
- Country: Romania
- Branch: Romanian Air Force
- Type: Air defense
- Size: eight battalions
- Garrison/HQ: Chitila

Commanders
- Current commander: Brigadier general Bogdan-Nicolae Istrate

The 1st Surface to Air Missiles Brigade "General Nicolae Dăscălescu" (Romanian: Brigada 1 Rachete Sol-Aer), is the main air defense unit of the Romanian Air Force. Its headquarters are located in Chitila. The brigade was created on August 1, 1973, by merging the 18th and 19th Mixed Anti-Aircraft Artillery Regiments. In 1995, it received the honorific name "General Nicolae Dăscălescu", after the first commander of the 1st Anti-Aircraft Artillery Regiment and a new battle flag. The main task of the 1st SAM Brigade is Bucharest's air defense.

The brigade's area of responsibility covers six counties. The unit currently operates MIM-23 Hawk missiles. The 7th HAWK Battalion was equipped with the MIM-23 missiles since 2006.

== History ==
The first surface-to-air missiles entered service with the Romanian Army in 1959. These equipped the 143rd and 261st Anti-Aircraft Artillery Regiments (former 1st and 2nd Anti-Aircraft Artillery Regiments). From 1973, the 18th and 19th Mixed Anti-Aircraft Artillery Regiments were merged into the 1st Mixed Anti-aircraft Missile Brigade. The Brigade changed its name to the 1st Anti-Aircraft Missile Brigade in 1998 after the Neva systems were retired. The current name was received on 1 September 2001.

In 2006, the HAWK Battalion was established, and the first shooting tests were performed in 2012. Also in 2012, the Brigade started taking part in the Air Police Combat Service.

== Structure ==
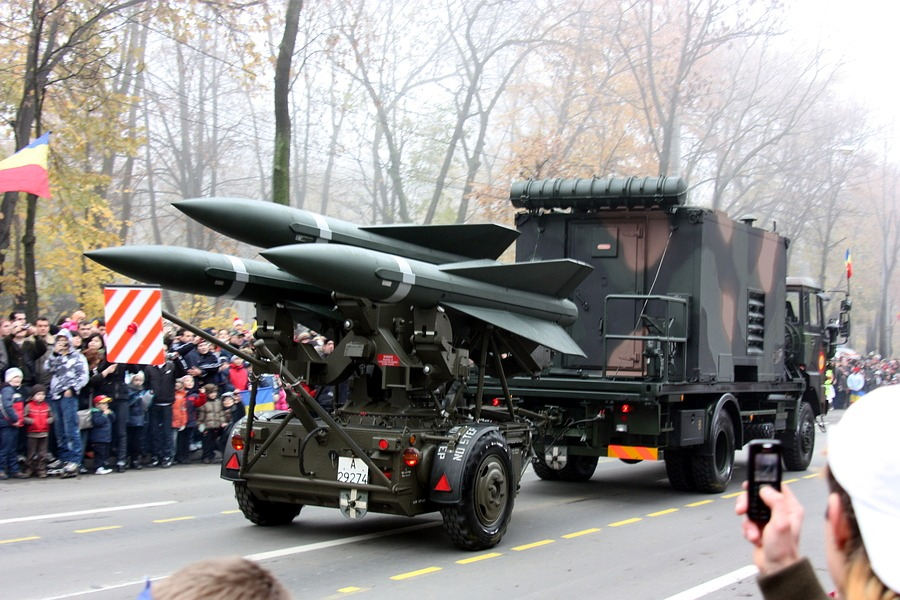
MIM-23 Hawk missile system.

- 1st SAM Brigade - HQ in Chitila
  - 111th SAM Battalion "Voievodul Mihai", in Boteni, with MIM-23 Hawk
  - 112th SAM Battalion, in Bucșani
  - 113th SAM Battalion "Codrii Vlăsiei", in Ghimpați
  - 114th SAM Battalion "Șoimii Bărăganului", in Adâncata, with MIM-23 Hawk and EL/M-2106 ATAR
  - 5th SAM Battalion "Horea", in Vâlcele, with MIM-23 Hawk
  - 7th HAWK Battalion
  - 8th Technical Battalion
  - 12th Support Group
    - Support Company
  - Force Protection Group

== Decorations ==
The 1st Surface to Air Missiles Brigade has received the following decorations:

- Order of Military Virtue, Peacetime (Knight – 2008, Officer – 2023)
