= Teiu, Argeș =

Teiu
- Commune
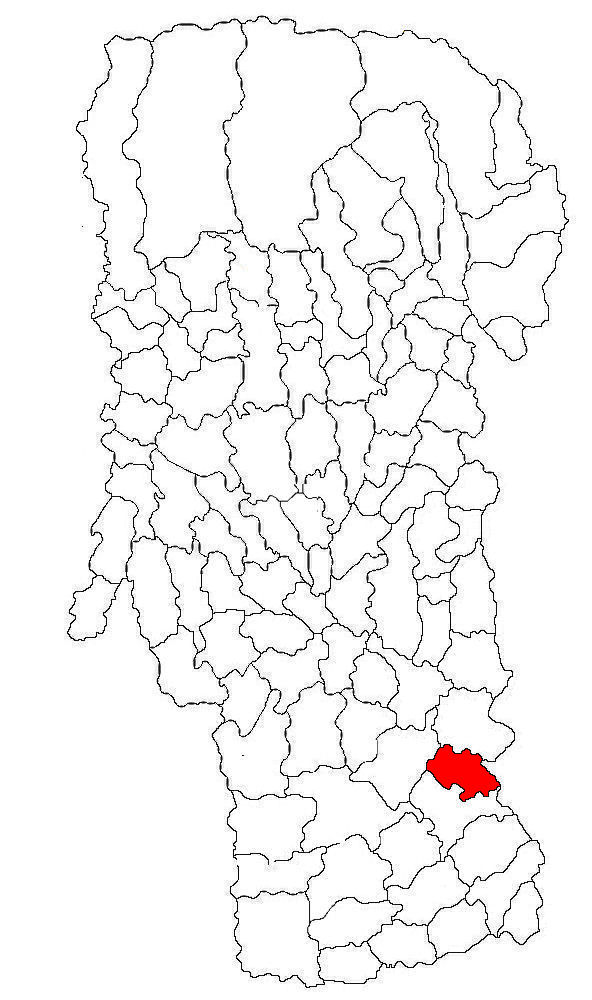
- Location in Argeș County

- Location in Romania
- Coordinates: 44°39′N 25°07′E
- Country: Romania
- County: Argeș

Government
  - Mayor (2024–2028): Florin Dumitru (PSD)
- Area: 44.66 km^{2} (17.24 sq mi)
- Elevation: 210 m (690 ft)
- Population (2021-12-01): 1,276
  - Density: 29/km^{2} (74/sq mi)
- Time zone: EET/EEST (UTC+2/+3)
- Postal code: 117735
- Area code: +(40) 248
- Vehicle reg.: AG
- Website: www.cjarges.ro/en/web/teiu/

Teiu is a commune in Argeș County, Muntenia, Romania. It is composed of two villages, Leșile and Teiu.

== Natives ==
- Vladimir Streinu (1902–1970), literary critic, poet, essayist, and translator
