= Sârbeni =

- Commune
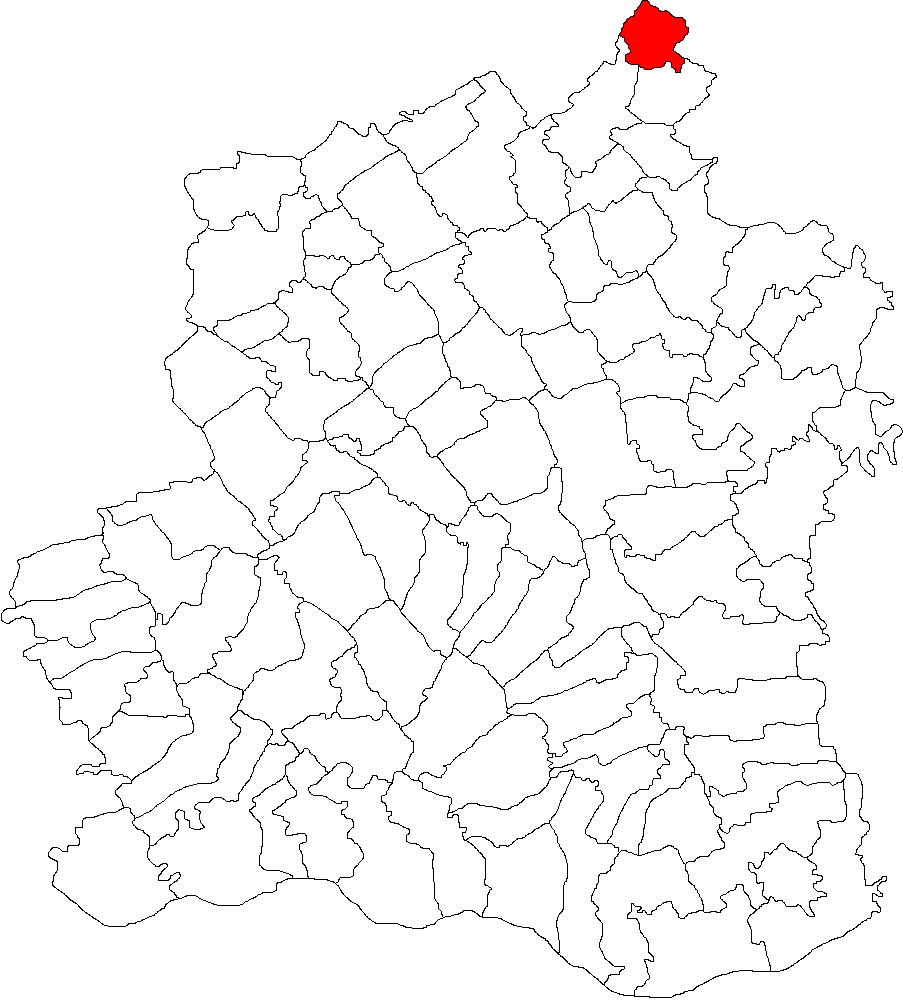
- Location in Teleorman County

- Location in Romania
- Coordinates: 44°28′N 25°23′E
- Country: Romania
- County: Teleorman
- Subdivisions: Sârbeni, Sârbenii de Jos, Udeni
- Population (2021-12-01): 1,497
- Time zone: EET/EEST (UTC+2/+3)
- Vehicle reg.: TR

Sârbeni is a commune in Teleorman County, Muntenia, Romania. It is composed of three villages: Sârbeni, Sârbenii de Jos and Udeni.
