= Șelaru, Dâmbovița =

Șelaru
- Commune
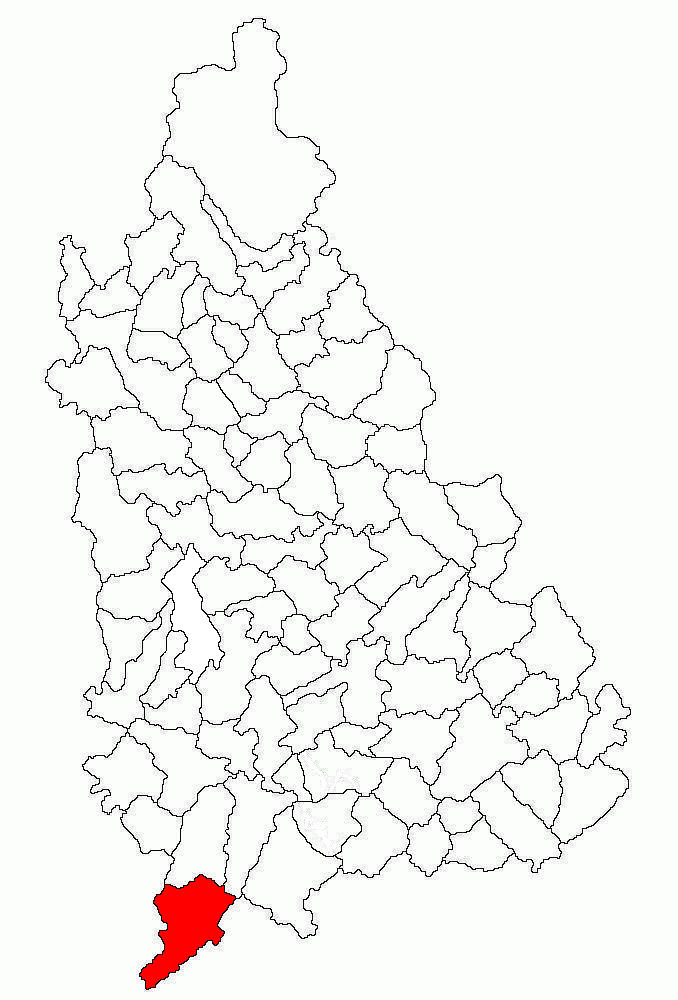
- Location in Dâmbovița County

- Location in Romania
- Coordinates: 44°28′N 25°18′E
- Country: Romania
- County: Dâmbovița

Government
  - Mayor (2024–2028): Gheorghiță Matei (PSD)
- Area: 82.53 km^{2} (31.87 sq mi)
- Elevation: 145 m (476 ft)
- Population (2021-12-01): 3,090
  - Density: 37/km^{2} (97/sq mi)
- Time zone: EET/EEST (UTC+2/+3)
- Postal code: 137425
- Area code: +(40) 245
- Vehicle reg.: DB
- Website: comunaselaru.ro

Șelaru is a commune in Dâmbovița County, Muntenia, Romania with a population of 3,090 people as of 2021. It is composed of three villages: Fierbinți, Glogoveanu, and Șelaru.

Historical population
Year	Pop.	±%
2002	3,952	—
2011	3,494	−11.6%
2021	3,090	−11.6%
Source: Census data

== Natives ==
- Ghiță Licu (1945–2014), handball pivot player
