= Roata de Jos =

- Commune
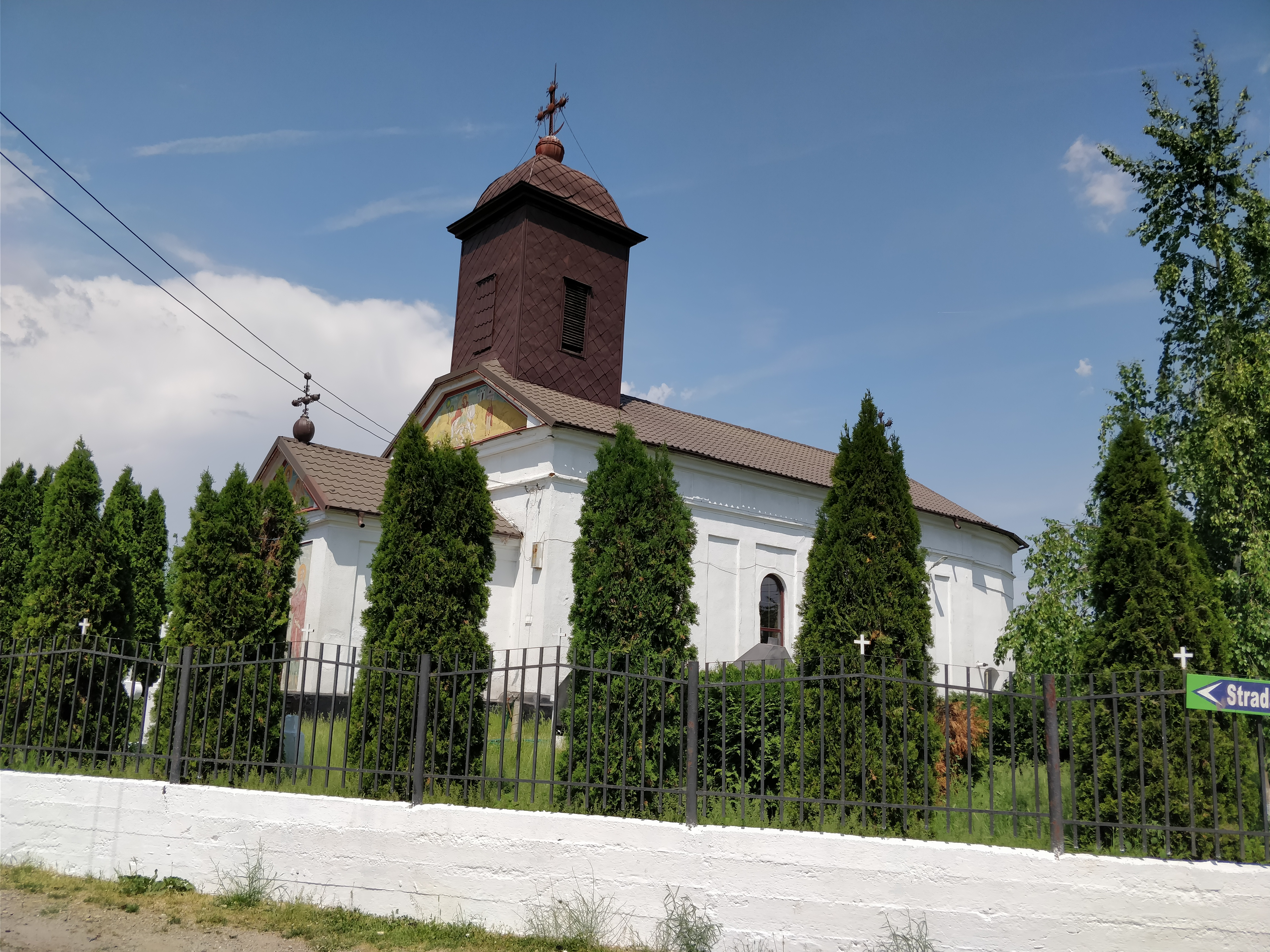
- St. George Church in Cartojani

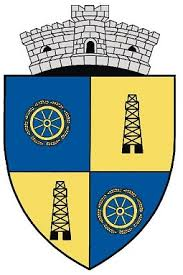
- Coat of arms

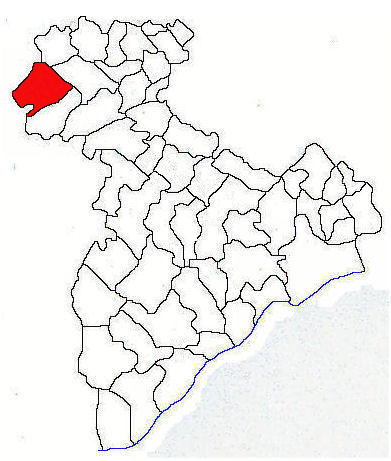
- Location in Giurgiu County

- Location in Romania
- Coordinates: 44°25′N 25°33′E
- Country: Romania
- County: Giurgiu

Government
  - Mayor (2024–2028): Marin Ghidănac (PNL)
- Area: 82.85 km^{2} (31.99 sq mi)
- Elevation: 108 m (354 ft)
- Population (2021-12-01): 7,691
  - Density: 92.83/km^{2} (240.4/sq mi)
- Time zone: UTC+02:00 (EET)
  - Summer (DST): UTC+03:00 (EEST)
- Postal code: 087195
- Area code: +(40) x46
- Vehicle reg.: GR
- Website: primariaroatadejos.ro

Roata de Jos is a commune located in Giurgiu County, Muntenia, Romania. It is composed of four villages: Cartojani, Roata de Jos, Roata Mică, and Sadina.

Historical population
Year	Pop.	±%
2002	8,477	—
2011	8,296	−2.1%
2021	7,691	−7.3%
Source: Census data

== Natives ==
- Alexandru Cartojan (1901–1965), historian and writer
- Neagu Udroiu (1940–2022), journalist and writer
