= Gratia, Teleorman =

Gratia
- Commune
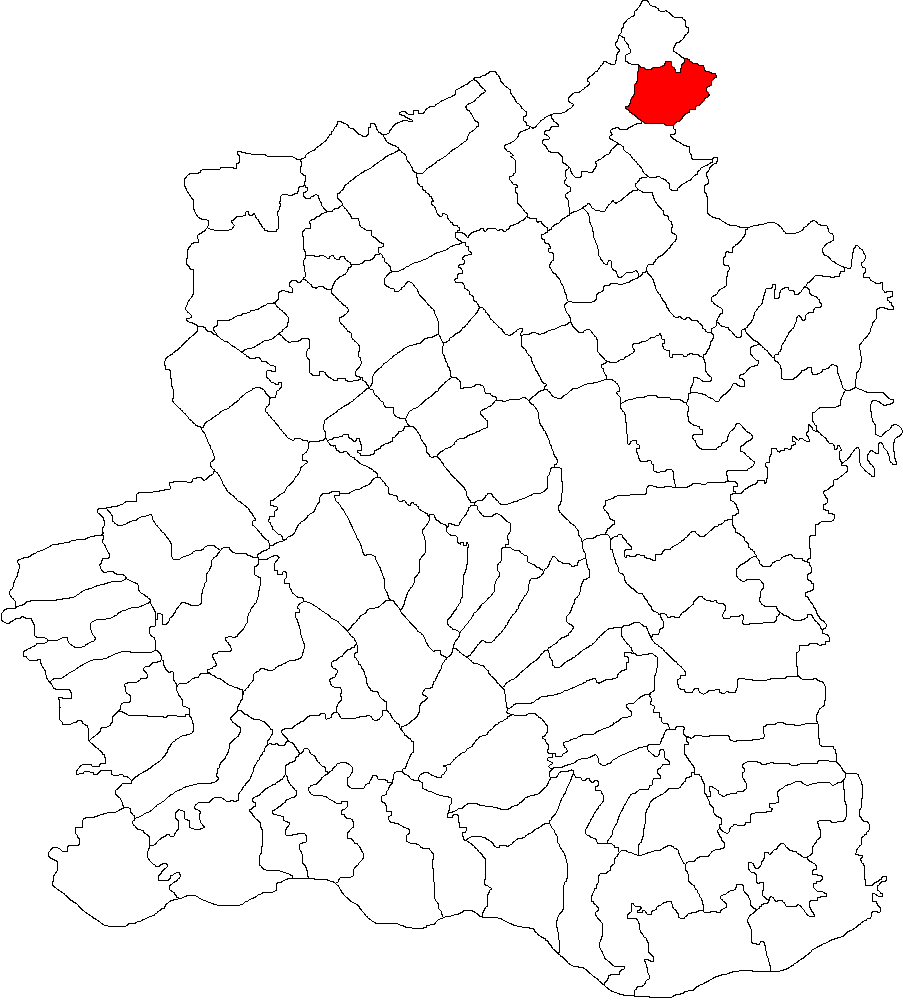
- Location in Teleorman County

- Location in Romania
- Coordinates: 44°26′N 25°26′E
- Country: Romania
- County: Teleorman
- Subdivisions: Ciurari-Deal, Drăghinești, Gratia
- Population (2021-12-01): 2,571
- Time zone: EET/EEST (UTC+2/+3)
- Vehicle reg.: TR

Gratia (Romanian pronunciation: [ˈgrati.a]) is a commune in Teleorman County, Muntenia, Romania. It is composed of three villages: Ciurari-Deal, Drăghinești and Gratia.
