= Arpechim Refinery =

Coordinates: 44.80°N 24.93°E

- Interactive map of the Arpechim Refinery area

General information
- Type: Oil refinery
- Location: Pitești, Argeș County
- Elevation: 220 m (722 ft)
- Completed: 1964
- Owner: Petrom

Height
- Height: 180 metres (chimney)

Technical details
- Floor area: 500 hectares (53,819,552 ft^{2})

Arpechim Refinery was one of the largest Romanian refineries and one of the largest in Europe, located in Pitești, Argeș County, and had both refining and petrochemical capacities. It was closed in 2011. The refinery had two processing modules with a nominal capacity of 6.5 million tonnes/year. The facility was connected by pipeline to the oil fields in the Oltenia Region and to the Port of Constanţa. The refinery produced around 60% of all the bitumen used in Romania.

== History ==
Arpechim was founded in 1964 in a strategic industrial zone located in Southern Romania near Pitești. In the same year the refinery built its first plant specialised in the production of carbon black. In 1967 another two distinct units were established, the Pitești Refinery and the Petrochemical Complex (Romanian: Rafinăria Piteşti şi Complexul petrochimic) and the Thermal Power Station (Romanian: Termocentrala). In 1971 the refinery was integrated with the Petrochemical Complex. In 1997 the state established Petrom as the national oil company also including the Arpechim Refinery. In 1999 Arpechim becomes the first refinery in Europe to produce and export diesel with a reduced sulfur content. In 2005 the refinery concludes the building of a new gasoil hydrotreater and new hydrogen plant.

In 2007, Petrom started negotiations with Oltchim (a major petrochemical company in Romania) for the sale of the petrochemical sector from the Arpechim Refinery. The two companies agreed on the transaction and Oltchim had to pay around US$ 150 million to close the deal. On February 17, 2009, Petrom decided to sell the petrochemical sector of the Arpechim Refinery to Oltchim for the price of 1 euro (US$ 1.25), but the buying company has to invest US$ 140 million in the sector due to contract clauses.

The Arpechim Refinery closed in 2011. EUR 52m was allocated by OMV in 2022 for remedial work to the soil on the old site.
