= Recaș =

- Town
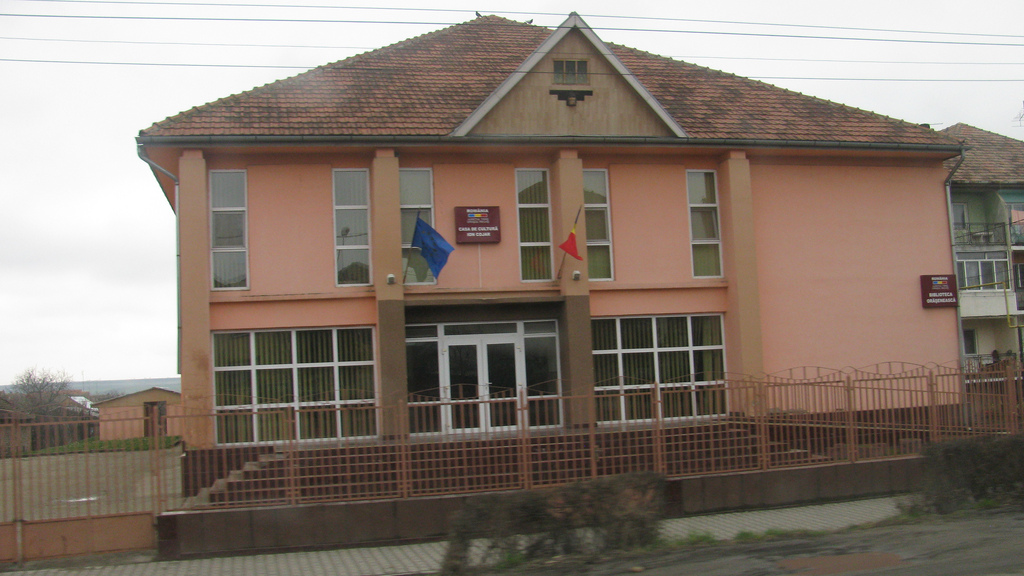
- House of Culture and Town Library

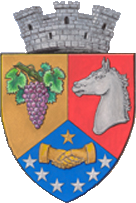
- Coat of arms

- Location in Timiș County

- Location in Romania
- Coordinates: 45°49′45″N 21°31′45″E
- Country: Romania
- County: Timiș

Government
  - Mayor (2024–2028): Aurel-Adrian Pavel (PSD)
- Area: 231.98 km^{2} (89.57 sq mi)
- Elevation: 106 m (348 ft)
- Population (2021-12-01): 8,347
  - Density: 35.98/km^{2} (93.19/sq mi)
- Time zone: UTC+02:00 (EET)
  - Summer (DST): UTC+03:00 (EEST)
- Postal code: 307340–307347
- Area code: (+40) 02 56
- Vehicle reg.: TM
- Website: primariarecas.ro

Recaș (archaically Armag; Hungarian: Temesrékas; German: Rekasch; Serbian: Рекаш, romanized: Rekaš) is a town in Timiș County, Romania. Six villages are administered by the town: Bazoș, Herneacova, Izvin, Nadăș, Petrovaselo, and Stanciova. It received town status in April 2004. Recaș is best known for the wine produced in the surrounding hills.

== Geography ==
Recaș covers an area of 231.98 km^{2} (89.57 mi^{2}), 2.66% of the total area of Timiș County, and is located in an area of sunny hills, favorable to agriculture.

Recaș is crossed to the south by the Timiș River and the Bega Canal. The climate is temperate continental with a slight Mediterranean influence, the winters being generally mild, the summers warm, the autumns long and the transitions from winter to summer quite sudden. Climatic and soil characteristics make this area particularly conducive to viticulture.

=== Relief and natural resources ===
Recaș is characterized by a hilly landscape that serves as a transitional zone between the northern highlands and the southern plains. In the northern part of the commune, approximately 45% of the terrain consists of the Lipova Hills, which form a natural link between the Banat Piedmont and the Western Plain. This area—including the localities of Stanciova, Herneacova, and Nadăș—exhibits piedmont features, with a general slope oriented from north-northeast to south-southwest and altitudes ranging between 280 and 178 meters.

As a result of both areal and linear erosion processes acting upon the platform bordered by streams, ravines, torrents, and creeks, a variety of landforms have developed. These can be classified as follows:

- Ridges: Typically elongated and undulating, with widths of up to 400–500 meters, these features gently slope toward the periphery and connect with the high plain at two to three elevation levels.
- Slopes: These vary in steepness, ranging from moderate inclinations of 3–8% to slopes exceeding 25%. Northern slopes tend to be steeper, while those facing south are generally more gradual.
- Intrahill valleys: These valleys range in width from several dozen meters to between 180 and 450 meters. Their general flow direction is from northeast to south or southwest. Within this system, the floodplains of the Băcin, Barcăș, and Gherteamoș streams converge.

The local resources include the Bega and Timiș rivers, which flow south of Recaș and Bazoș, respectively; the forests of Bazoș, Nadăș, and Herneacova; and fertile soils well-suited for vegetable cultivation and viticulture. The Recaș vineyards represent a significant resource, being cultivated both by Recaș Wineries and individual private growers.

== History ==
The oldest mention of Recaș dates from 1318. It has had its present name since the Middle Ages (as Rekas in 1450). The name has a Slavic root (Proto-Slavic *rěka = stream), but there is evidence that the village was Vlach. Thus, historian Nicolae Ilieșiu shows that, in 1359, several Romanian families from Moldavia settled in Recaș, who received land and privileges from King Louis the Great, without being forced to give up Orthodoxy. But a little later the Bulgarians received the same rights, so the ethnic composition was more varied.

It was noticed early on as an important center in the region. In 1470 there was an oppidum Rekas, which comprised 20 localities. It therefore received town privileges, and there was even a customs office here. In 1650, Serbs from the Bačka area settled in Recaș. The locals called them șocați (Šokci) because they were of Catholic religion and, according to some opinions, were Croats.

Following the waves of colonization, in the middle of the 17th century, three distinct settlements were formed: Recașul Valahilor (Vlașnița; "Vlachs' Recaș"), Recașul Șocaților (of the Serbs) and Recașul Bulgarilor ("Bulgarians' Recaș"). The Romanians had a less favorable location, close to the Timiș River, in the area of today's train station. Due to frequent floods and conflicts with the Serbs, they were forced to move, with many settling in the neighboring village of Izvin. Therefore, when the Habsburgs conquered Banat and drew up the first census, the "Vlachs' Recaș" appears as depopulated.

Under the Habsburgs, Recaș experienced a new stage of development, and colonization continued. In 1764, administrator Koll brought a large number of German settlers, who formed the nucleus of the "German Recaș". Until 1786, several waves of Swabian emigrants settled in Recaș in search of a better life. After Banat came under Hungarian administration, a process of Hungarianization and colonization with Hungarians took place. Hungarianization actually began around 1809, and the largest wave of Hungarian colonists settled in Recaș in 1899. In the late 19th and early 20th centuries, Recaș experienced an unprecedented period of development, polarizing social and economic life in the area (prefecture seat, court, land registry office and preception). In 1894 the brick factory with 100 employees was built, and in 1902 the first German newspaper, Temesrekaser Zeitung, appeared with weekly editions. During the interwar period, Recaș had a primary school, a Catholic confessional school, a casino, a fire brigade, a German agricultural circle and a sports club.

During the communist period (1948-1989), Recaș had the status of a commune with six villages belonging to it (Bazoș, Herneacova, Izvin, Nadăș, Petrovaselo and Stanciova). Following a local referendum and the fulfillment of the necessary administrative conditions, Recaș acquired town status in 2004.

== Demographics ==
Ethnic composition (2021)
1. Romanians (72.4%)
2. Hungarians (3.57%)
3. Serbs (1.76%)
4. Unknown (20.8%)
5. Others (1.45%)
Religious composition (2021)
1. Orthodox (60.5%)
2. Pentecostals (8.27%)
3. Roman Catholics (6.37%)
4. Serbian Orthodox (1.71%)
5. Unknown (21.4%)
6. Others (1.55%)
7. Irreligious, atheists and agnostics (0.21%)

Recaș had a population of 8,347 inhabitants at the 2021 census, up 0.13% from the 2011 census. Most inhabitants are Romanians (72.39%), larger minorities being represented by Hungarians (3.57%) and Serbs (1.76%). For 20.83% of the population, ethnicity is unknown. By religion, most inhabitants are Orthodox (60.47%), but there are also minorities of Pentecostals (8.27%), Roman Catholics (6.37%) and Serbian Orthodox (1.71%). For 21.42% of the population, religious affiliation is unknown.

Census		Ethnic composition
Year	Population	Romanians	Hungarians	Germans	Roma	Serbs	Croats	Slovaks
1880	10,332	3,769	568	2,109	–	3,759	–	101
1890	10,928	4,563	698	2,236	–	3,240	20	96
1900	12,004	4,757	1,684	2,295	–	1,920	43	109
1910	13,237	4,765	3,105	2,232	–	1,927	29	119
1920	11,626	3,979	2,573	2,102	–	–	–	–
1930	11,684	4,653	2,419	1,846	229	2,401	–	101
1941	11,730	5,098	2,308	1,649	–	–	–	–
1956	11,261	5,470	2,192	1,235	363	1,905	–	58
1966	10,806	5,693	1,813	1,157	422	1,685	–	22
1977	10,928	6,562	1,580	923	440	1,123	243	41
1992	8,665	6,334	1,082	222	219	669	100	17
2002	8,560	6,514	936	116	253	581	119	17
2011	8,336	6,423	635	65	178	356	76	5
2021	8,347	6,043	298	26	41	147	41	–

== Politics and administration ==
The town of Recaș is administered by a mayor and a local council composed of 17 councilors. The mayor, Aurel-Adrian Pavel, from the Social Democratic Party, has been in office since 2024. As from the 2024 local elections, the local council has the following composition by political parties:

Party	Seats	Composition
Social Democratic Party	10	
Social Liberal Humanist Party	4	
Save Romania Union	1	
Alliance for the Union of Romanians	1	
Force of the Right	1	

== Economy ==
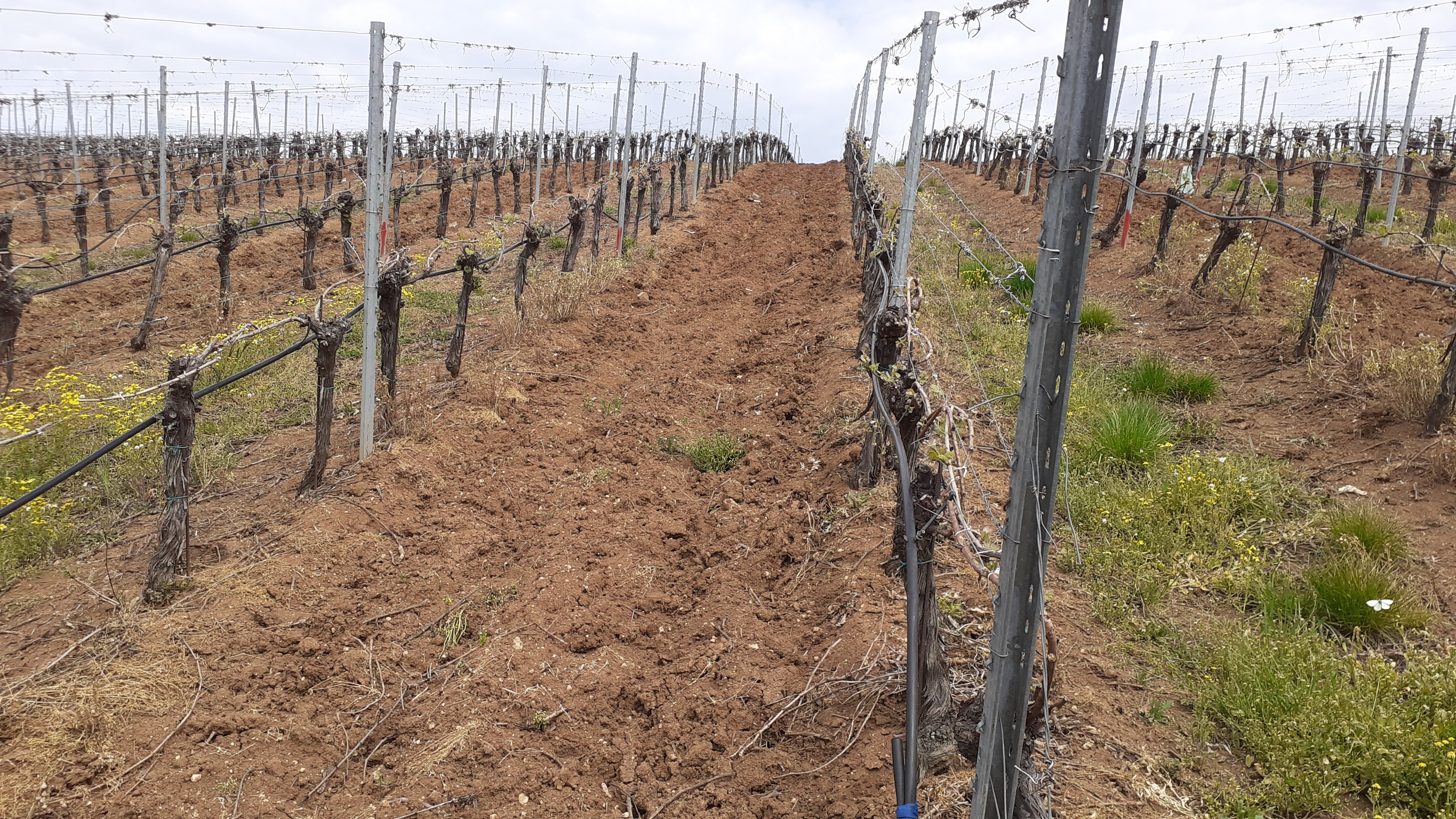
Vines at Recaș estate

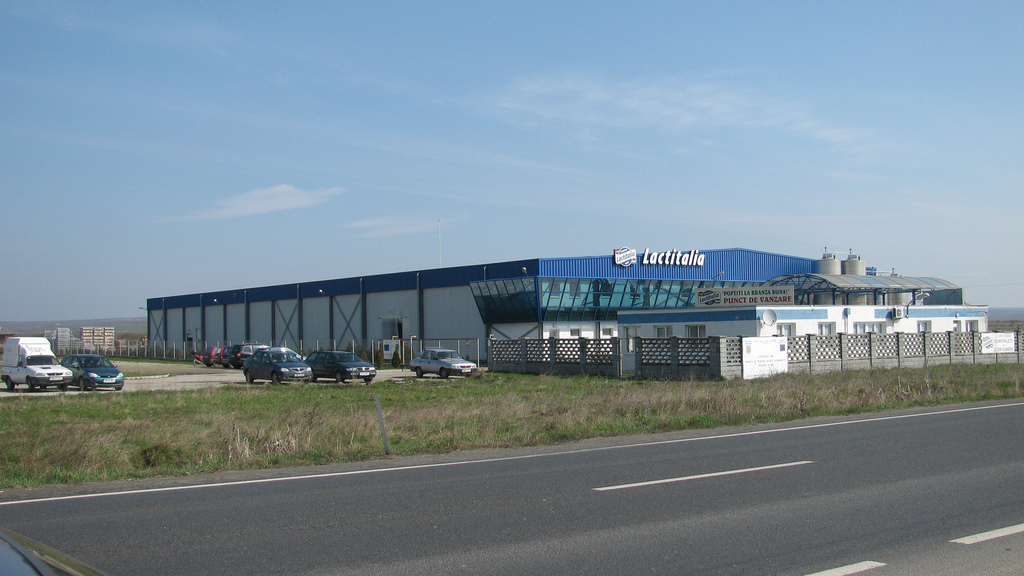
A cheese factory in Izvin

The area is best known for the quality of its wines. Recaș Wineries (Romanian: Cramele Recaș), founded in 1991, is the largest producer and exporter of wines in Romania. However, viticulture has a much older tradition in the area, which dates back to the 15th century. The grape varieties grown by Recaș Wineries are: Merlot, Pinot Noir, Cabernet Franc, Syrah, Negru de Drăgășani, Novac, Acalon, Cabernet Dorsa, Zweigelt, Cadarcă, Chardonnay, Sauvignon Blanc, Fetească Regală, Fetească Albă, Pinot Gris, Viognier, Muscat Ottonel, Furmint, Italian Riesling, and Rhine Riesling.

It is noteworthy, however, that in recent years economic activity has begun to diversify.

== Twin towns ==
Recaș is twinned with:

- (Serbia) Nova Crnja

== Notable people ==
- Antal Tass (1876–1937), astronomer
- Győző Mihailich (1877–1966), civil engineer
- Elek Schwartz (1908–2000), footballer and coach of Netherlands national team
- Ion Cojar (1931–2009), acting teacher and theater director
- János Oberten (1944–2020), journalist, writer, theater critic, translator and editor
