= Mozăceni =

- Commune
- Location in Romania
- Coordinates: 44°34′N 25°10′E
- Country: Romania
- County: Argeș

Government
  - Mayor (2020–2024): Liana-Corina Dună (PNL)
- Area: 82.43 km^{2} (31.83 sq mi)
- Elevation: 188 m (617 ft)
- Population (2021-12-01): 1,912
  - Density: 23/km^{2} (60/sq mi)
- Time zone: EET/EEST (UTC+2/+3)
- Postal code: 117515
- Area code: +40 x42
- Vehicle reg.: AG
- Website: www.cjarges.ro/en/web/mozaceni

Mozăceni is a commune in Argeș County, Muntenia, Romania. It is composed of three villages: Babaroaga, Mozăceni, and Zidurile.
