= Suseni, Argeș =

Suseni
- Commune
- Location in Romania
- Coordinates: 44.7124°N 24.9584°E
- Country: Romania
- County: Argeș
- Population (2021-12-01): 3,154
- Time zone: EET/EEST (UTC+2/+3)
- Vehicle reg.: AG

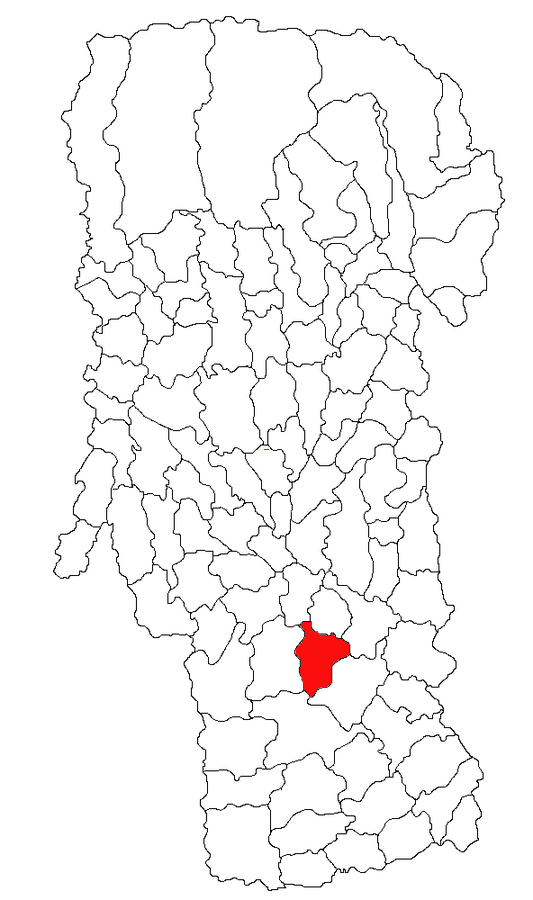
Locator map of the commune of Suseni in Argeș County, Romania

Suseni is a commune in Argeș County, Muntenia, Romania. It is composed of ten villages: Burdești, Cerșani, Chirițești, Gălășești, Odăeni, Pădureni, Strâmbeni, Suseni, Ștefănești and Țuțulești.
