= Negrași =

- Commune
- Location in Romania
- Coordinates: 44°36′N 25°7′E
- Country: Romania
- County: Argeș
- Population (2021-12-01): 1,911
- Time zone: UTC+02:00 (EET)
  - Summer (DST): UTC+03:00 (EEST)
- Vehicle reg.: AG

Negrași is a commune in Argeș County, Muntenia, Romania. It is composed of four villages: Bârlogu, Buta, Mozacu, and Negrași.

Near Negrași is situated Poiana cu Narcise Negrași (Negrași Daffodil Meadow), a natural reservation.
