= Sabar (river) =

River in Romania

The Sabar or Răstoaca is a left tributary of the river Argeș in Romania. It discharges into the Argeș in Valea Dragului. Its source is near the village Glâmbocel, west of Târgoviște. For much of its length, it flows parallel to and at a short distance from the Argeș. Its length is 174 km (108 mi) and its basin size is 1,346 km^{2} (520 sq mi).

== Towns and villages ==
The following towns and villages are situated along the river Sabar, from source to mouth: Bântău, Glâmbocata, Crângurile de Jos, Găești, Dragodana, Mătăsaru, Costeștii din Vale, Crovu, Potlogi, Florești, Stoenești, Palanca, Poenari, Bolintin-Vale, Mihai Vodă, Domnești, Bragadiru, Măgurele, Jilava, Vidra, Vărăști, Valea Dragului

== Tributaries ==
The following rivers are tributaries to the river Sabar (from source to mouth):

- Left: Saru, Potop, Cuparu, Mătăsarul, Frasin, Șuța, Băi, Ciorogârla, Cocioc
- Right: Tinoasa
