= Băi =

- Location within Romania

Location
- Country: Romania
- Counties: Dâmbovița, Giurgiu
- Villages: Sălcuța, Lungulețu, Poiana, Florești

Physical characteristics
- Mouth: Sabar
  - coordinates: 44.5094°N 25.6904°E
- Length: 35 km (22 mi)
- Basin size: 69 km^{2} (27 sq mi)

Basin features
- Progression: Sabar→ Argeș→ Danube→ Black Sea

The Băi is a left tributary of the river Sabar in Romania. It flows into the Sabar in Florești. Its length is 35 km (22 mi) and its basin size is 69 km^{2} (27 sq mi).
