= Cocioc =

- Location within Romania

Location
- Country: Romania
- Counties: Ilfov, Giurgiu
- Villages: Berceni, Vărăști

Physical characteristics
- Mouth: Sabar
  - coordinates: 44.2017°N 26.2720°E
- Length: 38 km (24 mi)
- Basin size: 156 km^{2} (60 sq mi)

Basin features
- Progression: Sabar→ Argeș→ Danube→ Black Sea

The Cocioc is a left tributary of the river Sabar in Romania. It flows into the Sabar in Valea Dragului. Its length is 38 km (24 mi) and its basin size is 156 km^{2} (60 sq mi).
