= Șuța =

- Location within Romania

Location
- Country: Romania
- Counties: Dâmbovița County
- Villages: Gura Șuții, Produlești, Odobești

Physical characteristics
- Mouth: Sabar
  - location: Pitaru
  - coordinates: 44.5859°N 25.5758°E
- Length: 60 km (37 mi)
- Basin size: 175 km^{2} (68 sq mi)

Basin features
- Progression: Sabar→ Argeș→ Danube→ Black Sea
- Tributaries
  - left: Spălătura
  - right: Ursoaia

The Șuța is a left tributary of the river Sabar in Romania. It discharges into the Sabar in Pitaru. Its length is 60 km (37 mi) and its basin size is 175 km^{2} (68 sq mi).
