= Titu =

- Town
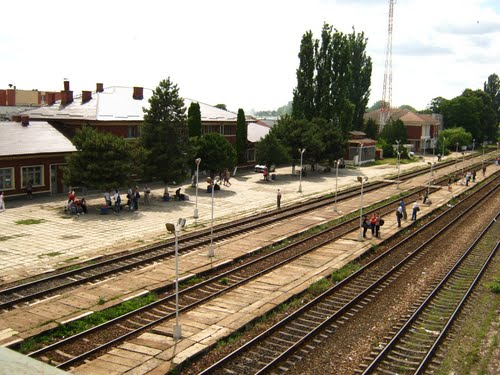
- Titu train station

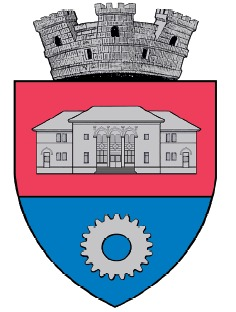
- Coat of arms

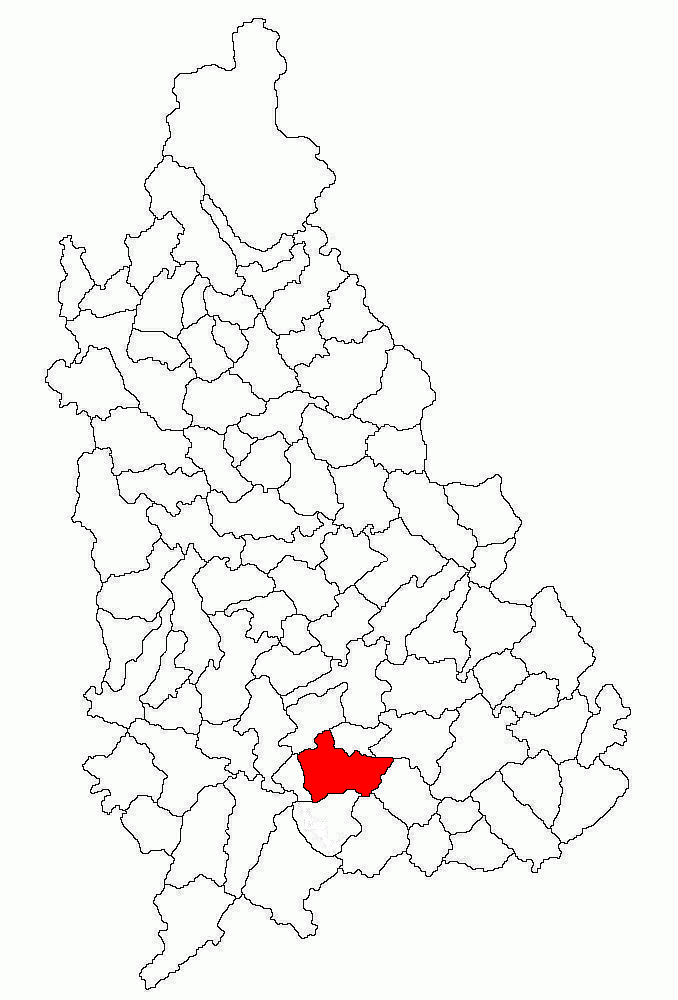
- Location in Dâmbovița County

- Location in Romania
- Coordinates: 44°39′44″N 25°34′25″E
- Country: Romania
- County: Dâmbovița

Government
  - Mayor (2024–2028): Costache Ionuț Laurențiu (PSD)
- Area: 42.51 km^{2} (16.41 sq mi)
- Elevation: 100 m (330 ft)
- Population (2021-12-01): 9,291
  - Density: 218.6/km^{2} (566.1/sq mi)
- Time zone: UTC+02:00 (EET)
  - Summer (DST): UTC+03:00 (EEST)
- Postal code: 135500
- Area code: (+40) 02 45
- Vehicle reg.: DB
- Website: primariatitu.ro

Titu (Romanian pronunciation: [ˈtitu]) is a town in Dâmbovița County, Muntenia, Romania, with a population of 9,291 as of 2021.

== Location ==
The town in located in the southern part of the county, in the center of the Wallachian Plain. It lies at a distance of 39.5 km (24.5 mi) from the county seat, Târgoviște, 52 km (32 mi) from Bucharest, and 73.5 km (45.7 mi) from Pitești. Titu is surrounded by several communes: Produlești and Braniștea to the north, Odobești and Potlogi to the south, Conțești and Lungulețu to the east, and Costeștii din Vale to the west.

== Zones and administration ==
Titu is divided into three main zones:

- Titu-gară – The main part of the city, it contains the town hall, the main school, the train station and most important buildings.
- Titu-târg – A rural zone which includes the town's library and the second school. It was also the former center town.
- Sălcuța – The smallest zone and a village in its own right, it is rural and features a church. It is also the place where the bâlci is held.

The town administers five other villages: Fusea, Hagioaica, Mereni, Plopu, and Sălcuța.

== Industry ==
The French automobile manufacturer Renault is operating a technical centre near the town of Titu, that is used for testing and optimizing vehicles of the Dacia brand. It became operational in September 2010 and the cost of the investment raised to 166 million euros. The centre includes 100 testing lines for parts and vehicles and 32 kilometres (20 miles) of test tracks that allow simulating various running conditions encountered around the world. It has 300 employees and is located halfway between the Mioveni factory and the research centre in Bucharest.

The town holds an annual fair on September 14.

Historical population
| Year | Pop. | ±% |
|---|---|---|
| 2002 | 10,183 | — |
| 2011 | 9,658 | −5.2% |
| 2021 | 9,291 | −3.8% |
Source: Census data

== Natives ==
- Dimitrie Dimăncescu (1896–1984), diplomat
- Ioan Dimăncescu (1898–1951), army officer
- Ion Miu (born 1955), virtuoso cimbalom player
