= Glâmbocel =

- Location within Romania

Location
- Country: Romania
- Counties: Argeș County
- Villages: Glâmbocel, Glodu, Budișteni

Physical characteristics
- Mouth: Budișteanca
  - location: Budișteni
  - coordinates: 44.8008°N 25.1521°E
- Length: 13 km (8.1 mi)
- Basin size: 16 km^{2} (6.2 sq mi)

Basin features
- Progression: Budișteanca→ Argeș→ Danube→ Black Sea

The Glâmbocel is a left tributary of the river Budișteanca in Romania. It flows into the Budișteanca in Budișteni. Its length is 13 km (8.1 mi) and its basin size is 16 km^{2} (6.2 sq mi).
