= Susan Setae =

Papua New Guinean women's rights leader

Susan Setae is a women's rights advocate from Papua New Guinea (PNG). She is the president of the PNG Counselling Association and former president of the National Council of Women.

== Early life ==
Susan Setae was born in Milne Bay Province in Papua New Guinea, where her parents were trainee pastors at, Lawes College, a London Missionary Society (LMS) school. At that time she was the youngest of four children. When she was four months old, her parents were posted to Goilala District in the Central Province. Later, they were transferred to their home area of Iokea in the Gulf Province, where her parents became village pastors, and where a younger brother was born. There she studied in her native tongue. At the age of 12, Setae was sent to an LMS boarding school. There, her living expenses were paid for by working, mainly on copra production. This was before PNG's independence in 1975 and the curriculum followed that of Australia, with mainly English and Samoan missionaries doing the teaching.

== Career ==
Impressed by the Pacific islanders from Samoa, Setae decided that she would also like to be a teacher and, after leaving high school, she got a job as a primary school teacher in Kikori in Gulf Province. In 1968 she moved to Rabaul in East New Britain Province to teach in a high school. The following year she went to the South Pacific Community Education Training Centre in Fiji, to do a course in community development. On completing her studies, she returned to Rabaul and worked at the Raluana Leadership Training Centre of the United Church, as one of the first women from PNG to have been made a training officer. In 1973, she started to travel around the country to train women in community skills. She did this in Balimo in Western Province, Maprik in East Sepik Province, Bai River in Western Highlands Province, in Manus Province, and in what is now the Autonomous Region of Bougainville.

Setae was the founder and president of Papua Hahine Social Action Forum, an organization involved in caring, counselling and providing support for victims of violence, mainly women and children, in association with other NGOs. It also works on strengthening families and promoting gender equality. She then became involved with the founding of the PNG Counselling Association, which was established by about 30 women working in the field of gender-based violence, who realised that counselling was the missing link in the support they were able to offer. In 2009, they started to call themselves barefoot counsellors and, realising that they needed to develop their expertise as counsellors, established an association that would strengthen their capacity to provide professional counselling and also address their own self-care, given the potential for burn out and psychological trauma. In 2018 a one-year diploma course in counselling was started at the Asia Pacific Training College in PNG's capital, Port Moresby. In addition, the Association has established an online counselling service.

Setae has also been president of PNG's National Council of Women. In 2012 she entered politics to become a member of the Triumph Heritage Empowerment Party and became leader of the women's wing of that party.

== Personal life ==
Setae has five children.
