= Suta =

Suta, Sūta, Šuta or Şuţa may refer to:

== People ==
- Šuta, Egyptian commissioner
- Jocelino Suta, French rugby union player
- Khassaraporn Suta, Thai weightlifter
- Miroslav Šuta, Czech environmental expert and writer

== Places ==
- Şuta, a village in Muereasca Commune, Vâlcea County, Romania
- Şuţa Seacă, a village in Raciu Commune, Dâmboviţa County, Romania
- Șuța River, a tributary of the Sabar River
- The historical name for Sutamarchán, Boyacá Department, Colombia

== Others ==
- Sūta refers both to the bards of Puranic stories and to a mixed caste
- Oha Suta, Japanese children's television show
- Suta (snake), a genus of venomous snakes
- Suta (album), a studio album by Paraziţii
- SUTA dumping, a practice used by some companies doing business in the U.S.A. to circumvent paying unemployment insurance taxes
