= Dimitrie Dimăncescu =

Romanian diplomat (1896–1984)

Dimitrie D. Dimăncescu (1896–1984) was a Romanian diplomat serving between 1922 and 1947. In 1913 with his brother Ioan Dimăncescu, he founded the Romanian Boy Scout Movement. He served as a military officer in World War I and in World War II was a member of the Free Romanian Movement in London while also working with British Intelligence to undermine Nazi influence in Romania. In 1946 he was Secretary of the Romanian Delegation to the Paris Peace Conference.

== Early life and education ==
Dimăncescu was born in Titu, Dâmbovița County. His family moved to Bucharest where he completed studies at Gheorghe Lazar College (high School). While there in 1913, he founded the Romanian Boy Scout Movement. He graduated in 1915.

== Military career ==
In 1915, Dimăncescu joined Prince Carol's Hunters Regiment. From August 1917 until the Armistice of 1918, he served as an officer, rising to the rank of captain. He aided British intelligence officers in the sabotage of Romania's oil wells and depots in December 1916 and participated in the Third Battle of Oituz of August 1917. He led his company against Rommel's German forces on Cosna Mountain. He was rewarded with the British Military Cross, the Virtutea Militară, the Star of Romania, the Order of St. Stanislas, Furajera Medal of the Order of Mihai Viteazul, and Commander of the Royal Victorian Order.

After the war ended, he was a member of the Romanian military sports delegation to the Allied War Games in Paris and then studied at and graduated from Carnegie Institute of Technology in Pittsburgh, Pennsylvania.

== Diplomatic career ==
Dimăncescu joined the diplomatic service and worked in Washington, DC for four years. He then took a leave of absence to work in London and Paris, and married in 1930.

Dimăncescu was assigned to serve as Consul General in San Francisco, California, where his principal mission was to promote positive reporting on Romania in national newspapers. He returned to Romania to serve as Minister of Propaganda in 1938 and then was assigned as press counsellor in the diplomatic service in London. With the outbreak of World War-II, he remained in London. In 1940, when Romania surrendered, he resigned his post, and was a founding member of the Free Romania Movement, a self-appounted government in exile.

During the early war years Dimăncescu served in British Intelligence, managing secret broadcasts from the Bletchley complex into Romania to undermine Nazi influence. At the end of the War he was recalled into official service as Secretary of the Romanian delegation to the Paris Peace Conference in 1946, and to the New York Conference. In December 1947, he returned to London when the Communist Regime took control of the Romanian government.

== Exile ==
An exile from his country, he settled in Marrakech, Morocco, with his family, and developed, in partnership with Roger Bertrand, a French citizen, plans for irrigation of the southern Moroccan plains which were to be funded by American investors. Because of rising tensions between Moroccan and French colonial authorities, these projects were prohibited by the French government. The violence surrounding Moroccan independence in 1956 led Dimăncescu to emigrate to the United States with his family, where he retired in Hartford, Connecticut.

Dimăncescu died in December, 1984 in Hartford, CT.

In 2010, Dimăncescu's son and grandson, Dan and Nick Dimancescu, created a film, Hill 789: The Last Stronghold, about the Dimăncescu brothers' experience on the Romanian front during World War I. Nick died the next year while filming a documentary about the Dacian wars.

== Publications ==
- Monumenta Cartografica, Bucharest (Romania), 1938. Editor
- King Carol and British Press, E.T. Heron & Co. Ltd, London (England), 1939 Editor
- Ordeal in Transylvania, A. T. Broome, & Son, Oxford (England), 1942
- Uncharted Journey: Memoirs of Dimitri D. Dimancescu – May 15, 2016, edited by Dan Dimancescu and published posthumously
- Călător Fără Hartă & Memoriile Lui Dimitri D. Dimăncescu - 1896-1984, edited by Dan Dimancescu, BTF Press, Concord, MA, 2017.

== Bibliography ==
- "Memorii Dimitrie Dimancescu: Jocurile Inter-Alaiate Paris 22 Junie-6 Julie, 1919", ASTRA, Serie Noua, Anul IV (XLVII), Nr. 3-4 (335–336) - 2013.
- "Memorii Dimitrie Dimancescu: Cercetașul", ASTRA, Serie Noua, Anul IV (XLVII), Nr. 1-2 (333–334) - 2013.
- "1860-1935 Liceul Gh. Lazar - Bucuresti," Institutul de Arte Grafica Luceafarul, Bucharest (Romania), 1935
- 'Useful Life Rendered: The Romanian Life of Dimitri Demetrius Dimancescu' in 'Timeless and Transitory,' Ernest Latham, Vremea, Bucharest, 2012."
