= Ioan Dimăncescu =

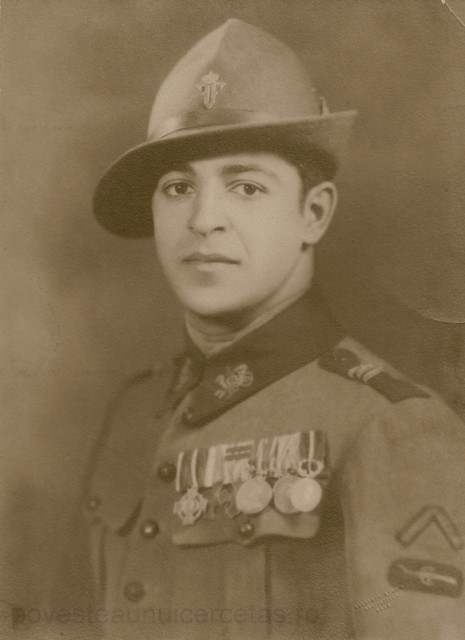
Captain Ioan Dem. Dimăncescu from the Mountain Troops (RO: vânători de munte), 1925

Ioan Dem. Dimăncescu (October 12, 1898, Titu – September 26, 1951, Bucharest) was a Romanian army officer, with a degree in physical education. He participated in the Boy and Girl Scouts programs of Romania and was a Scout leader.

== Early life and education ==
Dimăncescu graduated from the International YMCA College in Springfield, Massachusetts, USA, with a Bachelor of Science degree in Physical Education in 1926.

Dimăncescu and his brother Dimitrie were founding members of the Boy Scout patrols in Romania (in summer 1913). The organization was based on the English scouting guidelines at Gheorghe Lazăr High School in Bucharest.

== Career ==
Dimăncescu enrolled in the Officers School in Botoșani (in October 1916). Upon graduation he served as a second lieutenant in the 1st Cyclists’ Company, 1st Cavalry Division. In August 1917 he participated in the battles of Cosna / Hill 789 and Oituz-Grozești / Hill 383. He was wounded in the campaign from Basarabia (1918) and upon recovery participated in the anti-communist campaign of the Romanian army in Hungary (1919).

In 1919 he was a member of the Romanian rugby team at the Inter-Allied Games in Paris.

Dimăncescu took YMCA courses in Romania (1920–1921) and became a ski instructor in the 1st Mountain Troops Battalion in Sinaia. Between 1921 and 1929, he was transferred to the National Institute of Physical Education (INEF) and Military Institute of Physical Education (IMEF) being involved in the new structures development. He published sports methodology articles in the Physical Education Bulletin.

He led the Romanian military teams’ participation in abroad sporting competitions and organized international ski and biathlon contests (1926–1934) in Romania, under the command of Lt.Col. Emil Pălăngeanu. Dimăncescu promoted and organized winter sports (ski, sledges and bobsleigh) contests.

In 1923 he became a founding member and the first president of Sinaia - Peleș Sporting Association. After leaving for studies, he returned as a president from 1926 to 1929.

During 1942-1945 Dimăncescu was the president of the Romanian Ski Federation and from 1945 to 1947 he worked in the YMCA camp from Timisul de Sus, Predeal. He was a member of the Travelers' Inn / Hanul Drumetilor (1924), Turing Clubul Romaniei (1925–1947), Predeal Friends' Association / Amicii Predealului and the "Bucharest Ski Club".

Starting with 1920 Dimăncescu was a leader of Sinaia Boy Scouts and from 1927 until 1937 he was one of the commanders in Bucharest. In 1929 he reorganized the activity of the Romanian Boy Scouts and Girl Scouts. He participated in national and international scouts conferences and Jamoborees.

He was promoted to the position of Physical Education and Health Director within Straja Țării and attended "Ora Străjerilor" radio show (1938–1940). He was also a guard commander of the Boys' Grand Legion/Falanga and a master instructor of the Guard Commanders' Center from Breaza.

From 1942 to 1944 Dimăncescu coordinated the paramilitary organization Romanian Youth Labour / Munca Tineretului Român (MTR) from Breaza.

== Awards ==
Dimăncescu was received the Military Virtue Medal, the British War Medal, the Service Cross 1916-1919 – Tg. Ocna Bar, Furajera Medal of Mihai Viteazul and The Scouting Virtue award. The Dimăncescu Local Center from Bucharest of the Romanian scouts was named after him.
