= Budișteanca =

- Location within Romania

Location
- Country: Romania
- Counties: Argeș County

Physical characteristics
- Mouth: Argeș
  - location: Baloteasca
  - coordinates: 44.7536°N 25.1635°E
- Length: 29 km (18 mi)
- Basin size: 91 km^{2} (35 sq mi)

Basin features
- Progression: Argeș→ Danube→ Black Sea
- Tributaries
  - left: Glâmbocel

The Budișteanca is a left tributary of the river Argeș in Romania. It discharges into the Argeș near Leordeni. It flows through the villages Bujoi, Bârloi, Bogați, Chițești, Schitu Scoicești, Budișteni and Ciulnița. Its length is 29 km (18 mi) and its basin size is 91 km^{2} (35 sq mi).
