= Ulmi, Giurgiu =

Ulmi
- Commune
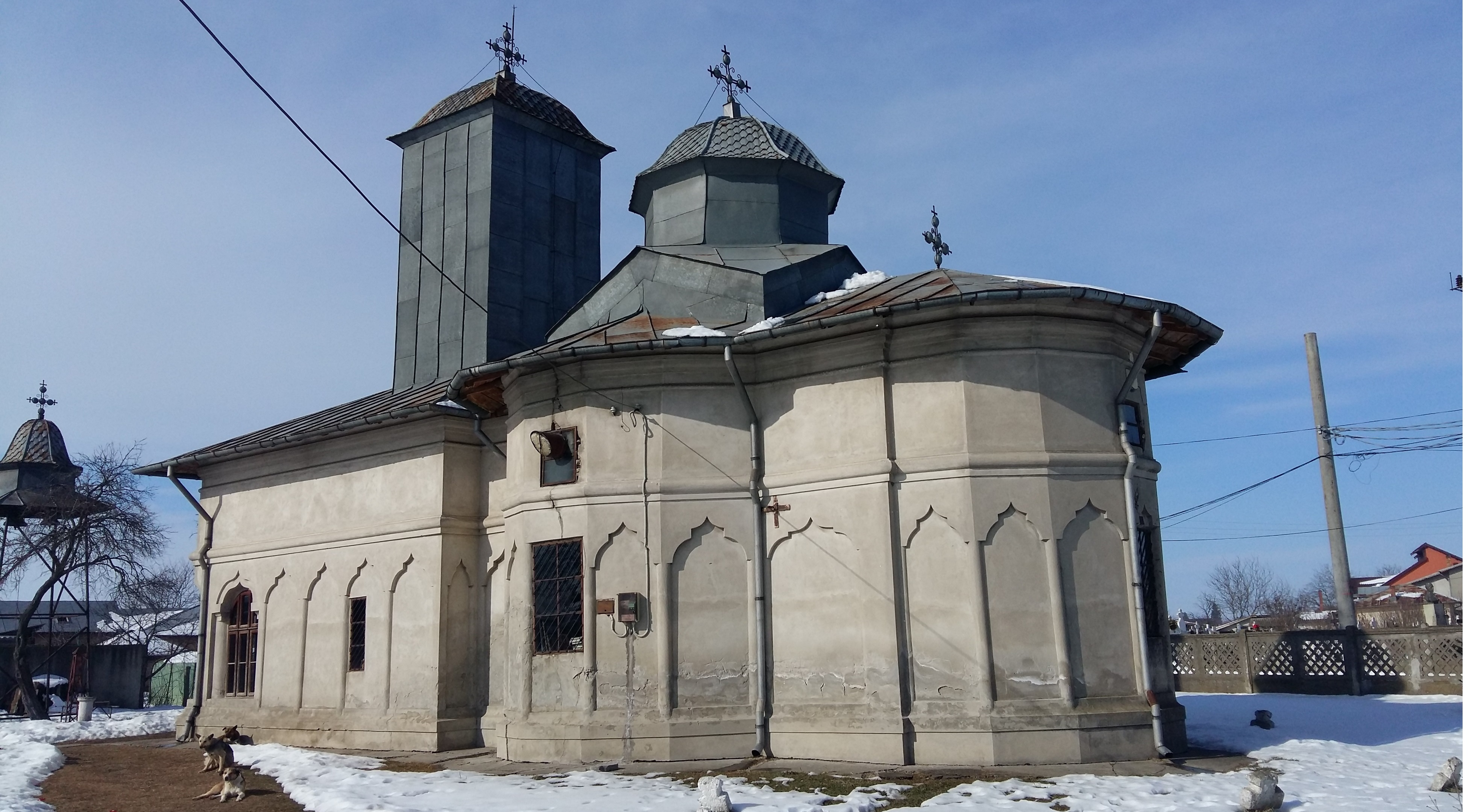
- Saint Nicholas church in Poenari village

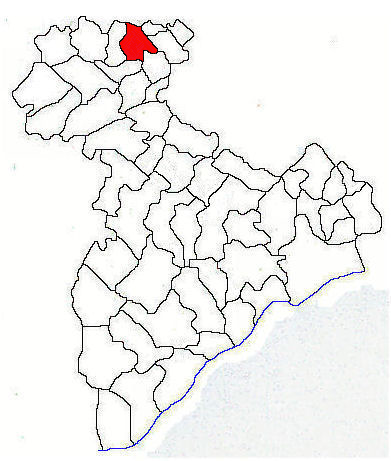
- Location in Giurgiu County

- Location in Romania
- Coordinates: 44°29′N 25°47′E
- Country: Romania
- County: Giurgiu

Government
  - Mayor (2020–2024): Nicolae Petre (PSD)
- Area: 43.54 km^{2} (16.81 sq mi)
- Elevation: 109 m (358 ft)
- Population (2021-12-01): 7,869
  - Density: 180.7/km^{2} (468.1/sq mi)
- Time zone: UTC+02:00 (EET)
  - Summer (DST): UTC+03:00 (EEST)
- Postal code: 087230
- Area code: +(40) 246
- Vehicle reg.: GR
- Website: primariaulmigr.ro

Ulmi is a commune located in Giurgiu County, Muntenia, Romania. It is composed of eight villages: Căscioarele, Drăgăneasca, Ghionea, Icoana, Moșteni, Poenari, Trestieni, and Ulmi.

The commune is situated in the Wallachian Plain, on the banks of the river Sabar. It is located in the northern part of the county, on the border with Dâmbovița County.

Historical population
Year	Pop.	±%
2002	7,724	—
2011	7,818	+1.2%
2021	7,869	+0.7%
Source: Census data
