= Romanian Youth Labour =

- Munca Tineretului Român
- MTR insignia
- Founder: Ion Antonescu
- Leader: Emil Pălăngeanu
- Coordinator of the Breaza Center: Ioan Dimăncescu
- Founded: 23 December 1941
- Dissolved: 23 August 1944
- Country: Romania
- Allegiance: Ion Antonescu's regime
- Headquarters: Breaza, Prahova County, in the former building that housed the headquarters of Straja Țării, now home to the "Dimitrie Cantemir" Military College.
- Ideology: Romanian ultranationalism Militarism; Anti-communism; Fascism; Antisemitism; Antiziganism
- Political position: Far-right
- Status: Dissolved

The Romanian Youth Labour (Romanian: Munca Tineretului Român – MTR) was a national auxiliary paramilitary labour organization active in Romania between 1941 and 1944.

== History ==
=== Establishment ===
The Romanian Youth Labour was established on 23 December 1941 under Ion Antonescu’s military dictatorship, with the purpose of ideologically organizing Romanian youth and aligning them with state policies. It was essentially conceived as an alternative for the youth to joining the notorious Iron Guard, which Antonescu had suppressed following the Legionary Rebellion of January 1941.

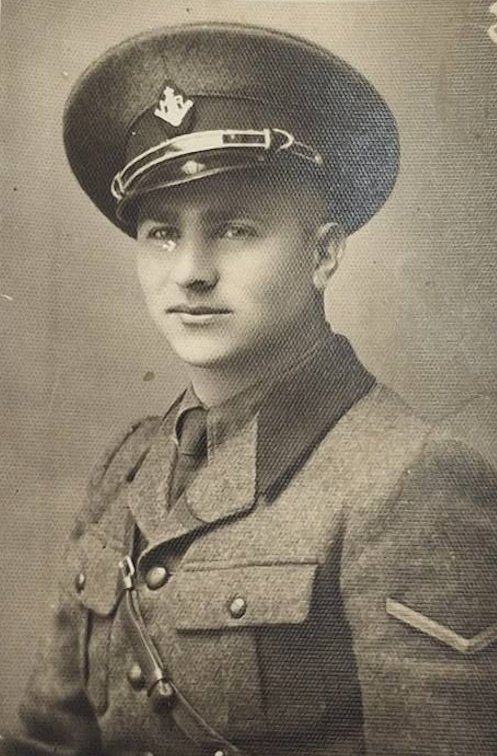
A young man wearing the uniform of the MTR. The MTR insignia is visible on his cap. He is most likely an instructor, given the Romanian Army non-commissioned officer (NCO) peaked cap.

By Decree no. 3.597 issued by Ion Antonescu on 23 December 1941 and published in Monitorul Oficial (the government's official gazette) on 3 January 1942, Brigadier General Emil Pălăngeanu was appointed commander of the Romanian Youth Labour. Alongside him served Lt. Col. Ioan Dem. Dimăncescu, who coordinated the organization’s Breaza Center.

Both Pălăngeanu and Dimăncescu had long careers in the military, scouting, youth training, and sports, and had previously served in King Carol II's Straja Țării (English: Sentinel of the Motherland), which organized extensive youth programs ranging from labor camps and sports competitions to military training.

The organization's headquarters was in Breaza as well, in the same building that today houses the "Dimitrie Cantemir" National Military College. Between 1937 and 1940, the Commanders’ Center of Straja Ţării was also located there.

=== Structure ===
The MTR was primarily inspired by the Reichsarbeitsdienst (English: Reich Labour Service), Organisation Todt, and, to some extent, the Hitlerjugend (English: Hitler Youth). Most likely for advisory and consultative purposes, on 8 March 1943 its commander, Emil Pălăngeanu, met with Konstantin Hierl, head of the Reichsarbeitsdienst.

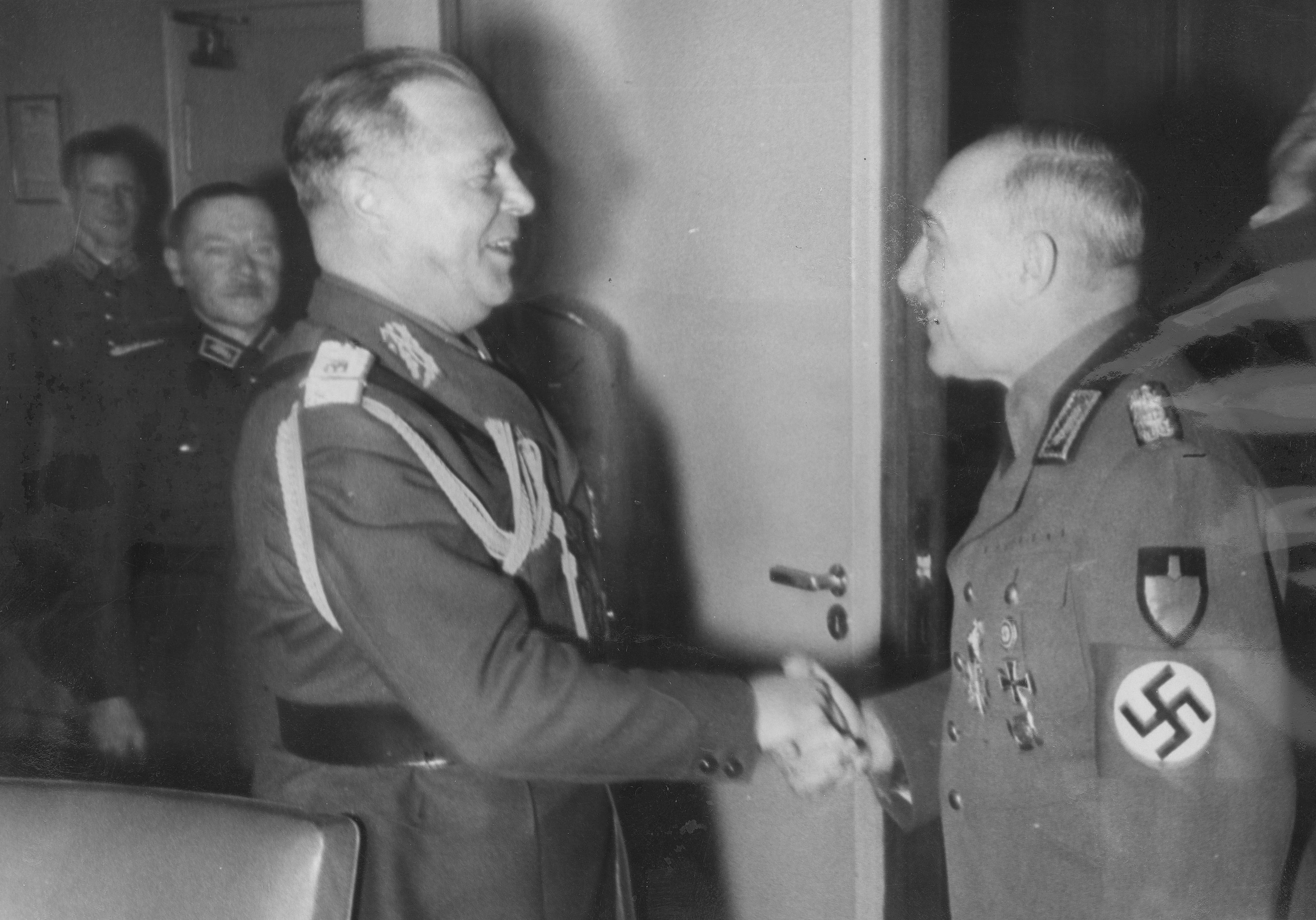
Head of the Reich Labuor Service Konstantin Hierl (right) welcomes the leader of the Romanian Youth Labour Emil Pălăngeanu.

The organization aimed to educate Romanian youth in the spirit of social labour through their involvement in civil construction and public utility projects such as roads, bridges, viaducts, aqueducts, and tunnels. Article 1 of the MTR statute, among other provisions, prescribed preparation of the youth for military service and the cultivation of a sense of national solidarity.

Article 3 of the MTR statute prescribed that young men fit for military service, once recruited, shall serve in the organization for seven months prior to their conscription into the army. Compulsory public service labour within the Kingdom of Romania was regulated by Law no. 425 of 15 May 1941 and applied to both Jews and Romanians, including the unemployed, labour camp prisoners, and those incorporated into the MTR.

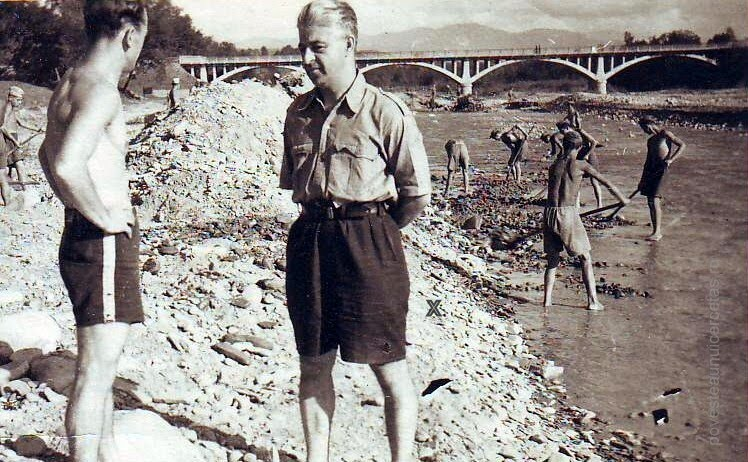
Members of the Romanian Youth Labour working at the Teleajen River development site, Vălenii de Munte, 1943.

=== Dissolution ===
The organization ceased its activity after 23 August 1944, when Antonescu's government was overthrown by King Michael I with the support of an alliance between the communists and the traditional political parties, subsequently ending Romania's collaboration with Nazi Germany and joining the Allies. It was ultimately dissolved sometime in 1945.

== See also ==
- Fascist paramilitary
- Civil conscription
- Military conscription
- Forced labor
- Labor law
