= Gura Șuții =

- Commune
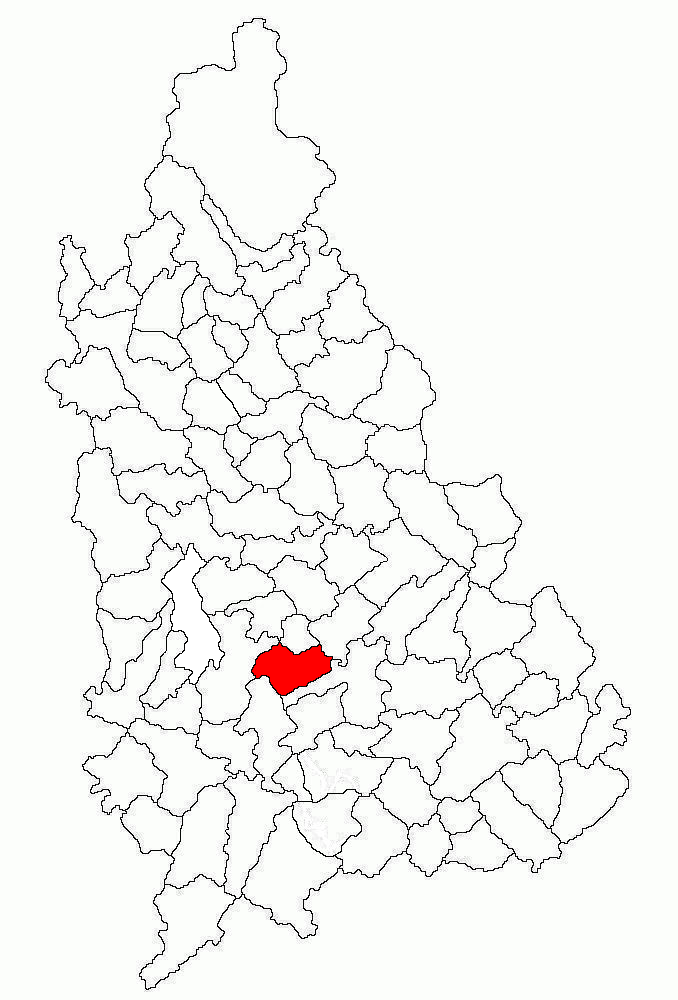
- Location in Dâmbovița County

- Location in Romania
- Coordinates: 44°45′N 25°31′E
- Country: Romania
- County: Dâmbovița

Government
  - Mayor (2020–2024): Constantin Dinu (PSD)
- Area: 27.28 km^{2} (10.53 sq mi)
- Elevation: 201 m (659 ft)
- Population (2021-12-01): 5,106
  - Density: 190/km^{2} (480/sq mi)
- Time zone: EET/EEST (UTC+2/+3)
- Postal code: 137245
- Area code: +(40) 245
- Vehicle reg.: DB
- Website: primariagurasutii.ro

Gura Șuții is a commune in Dâmbovița County, Muntenia, Romania. It is composed of two villages, Gura Șuții and Speriețeni.

== Geography ==
The commune is located in the central-southern area of the county, south of the county seat, Târgoviște, on the right bank of the Dâmbovița River. It is crossed by the county roads DJ721 and DJ721A, which connect it to Târgoviște, Costeștii din Deal, and Cuparu.

Historical population
Year	Pop.	±%
2002	5,400	—
2011	5,462	+1.1%
2021	5,106	−6.5%
Source: Census data
