= Bogați =

- Commune
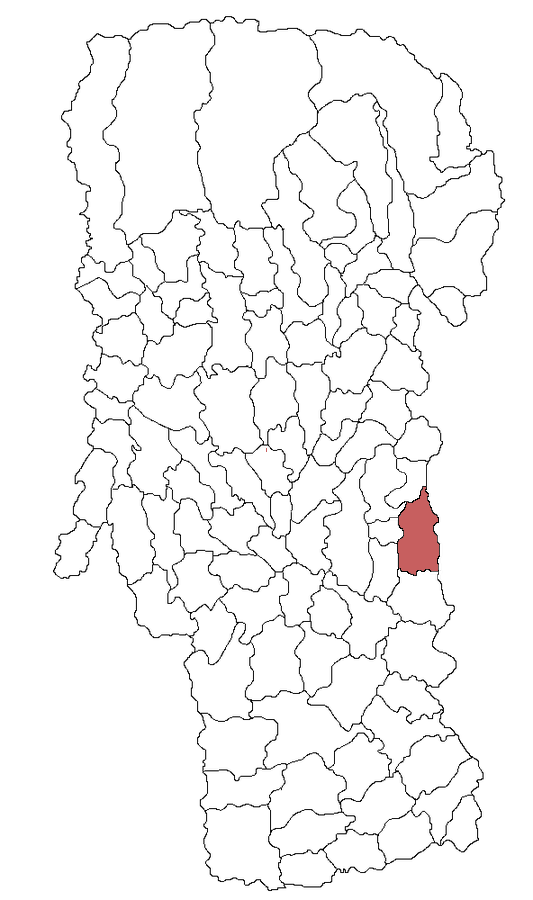
- Location in Argeș County

- Location in Romania
- Coordinates: 44°52′N 25°8′E
- Country: Romania
- County: Argeș

Government
  - Mayor (2024–2028): Ion Gîrleanu (PSD)
- Area: 70.4 km^{2} (27.2 sq mi)
- Elevation: 354 m (1,161 ft)
- Population (2021-12-01): 4,038
  - Density: 57.4/km^{2} (149/sq mi)
- Time zone: UTC+02:00 (EET)
  - Summer (DST): UTC+03:00 (EEST)
- Postal code: 117120
- Area code: +(40) 248
- Vehicle reg.: AG
- Website: www.cjarges.ro/en/web/bogati/

Bogați is a commune in Argeș County, Muntenia, Romania. It is composed of eight villages: Bârloi, Bogați, Bujoi, Chițești, Dumbrava, Glâmbocel, Glâmbocelu, and Suseni.

The commune is situated at the point of contact of the Wallachian Plain with the Getic Plateau. It lies on the banks of the river Budișteanca and of its tributary, the river Glâmbocel; the river Sabar has its source here.

Historical population
Year	Pop.	±%
2002	4,981	—
2011	4,636	−6.9%
2021	4,038	−12.9%
Source: Census data
