= Constantin Fântâneru =

Romanian writer and literary critic

Constantin Fântâneru (January 1, 1907–March 21, 1975) was a Romanian poet, prose writer and literary critic.

Born in Budișteni, Argeș County, his parents were Costache Fântâneru and Zoe (née Cârstoiu), peasants. After attending primary school in his native village from 1914 to 1919, he went to Saint Sava National College in Bucharest, graduating in 1927. His classmates there included Alexandru Sahia, Eugène Ionesco and Dan Botta; together, the group published Ramuri fragede magazine from 1926 to 1927. Fântâneru subsequently studied classical philology at the University of Bucharest's literature and philosophy faculty, earning a degree in 1930. He edited the business newspaper Prezentul, led by Virgil Madgearu from 1935. From 1936, he was editing secretary at Universul and editor for Universul literar, where he published the book review column from 1938 to 1941. Fântâneru suffered a nervous breakdown in 1942 and was hospitalized in Bucharest for six years. From 1948, he led a withdrawn existence in his native village. With his health partly restored, he taught Latin, French, English, Russian and German at Siliștea, Budișteni and Topoloveni from 1950 to 1968.

Fântâneru belonged to the Criterion literary group, and was active in the classical studies circle affiliated with Bucharest University's Latin department. His first published work appeared in 1927 in Revista literară a Liceului „Sf. Sava”. His first novel, Interior, appeared in 1932; it won that year's prize from the Romanian Writers' Society. Described by Mircea Eliade as "lacking a subject" and "confused", it was seen by George Călinescu as "a lyrical journal, analyzing the uncertain psychology of the 'new generation'", written with "a certain deliberate incoherence and an uncaring acceptance of the absurd".

A critical study, Poezia lui Lucian Blaga şi gândirea mitică, came out in 1940; the poetry volume Râsul morților de aur appeared the same year. Cărți și o altă carte (1999) included his published work as well as a selection of writings he left in manuscript. His contributions appeared in Cuvântul, Viața literară, Vremea, Convorbiri Literare and Revista Fundațiilor Regale. Other writings in manuscript include prose poems, annotated translations and memoirs. In 1932, he was awarded the Romanian Writers' Society prize. He died in Ștefănești.
