= Peleș Sporting Association =

Interwar organization in Romania

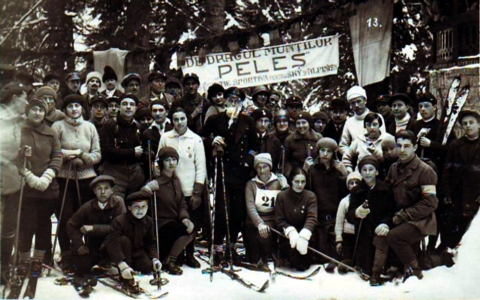
Group photo after a ski contest (1926); center: Prince Nicholas of Romania; bottom right: cpt. Ioan Dem. Dimăncescu, president of the association

Peleş Sporting Association was an inter-war organization having as a goal the development of winter sports and mountaineering in Romania.

== History ==
The organization was founded in 1923 by a group of sports promoters led by Ioan Dem. Dimăncescu and Decebal Mateescu (the first two presidents). The association was supported by Sinaia City Hall, the 1st Mountain Troops Battalion, as well as by the members of the Romanian Royal Family.

The association had ski, sledges and bobsleigh sections targeting the following age categories: over 20 y.o. (category I), between 14-20 (category II) and below 14 (category III).

Besides the promotion activity and winter sports start-up, Peleș Sporting Association organized a lot of official contests and national championships. The most famous sportsman trained by the association was Constantin Ciocoiu who won many of the ski, sledge and skeleton competitions between 1929 and 1940.
