= Alexandru Stănică =

Romanian footballer

Personal information
- Full name: Alexandru Iulian Stănică
- Date of birth: 6 September 2000 (age 26)
- Place of birth: Florești-Stoenești, Romania
- Height: 1.81 m (5 ft 11 in)
- Position: Defender

Team information
- Current team: Unirea Slobozia
- Number: 4

Youth career
- Avântul Florești
- –2018: Concordia Chiajna

Senior career*
Years	Team	Apps	(Gls)
2018–2024	Concordia Chiajna	61	(3)
2018–2021	Concordia II Chiajna	9	(1)
2021–2022	→ Metalul Buzău (loan)	28	(2)
2024–2026	Petrolul Ploiești	9	(0)
2025–2026	→ Tunari (loan)	22	(0)
2026–	Unirea Slobozia	9	(0)
- * Club domestic league appearances and goals as of 31 October 2026

Alexandru Iulian Stănică (born 6 September 2000) is a Romanian professional footballer who plays as a defender for Liga II club Unirea Slobozia.
