= Florești-Stoenești =

- Commune
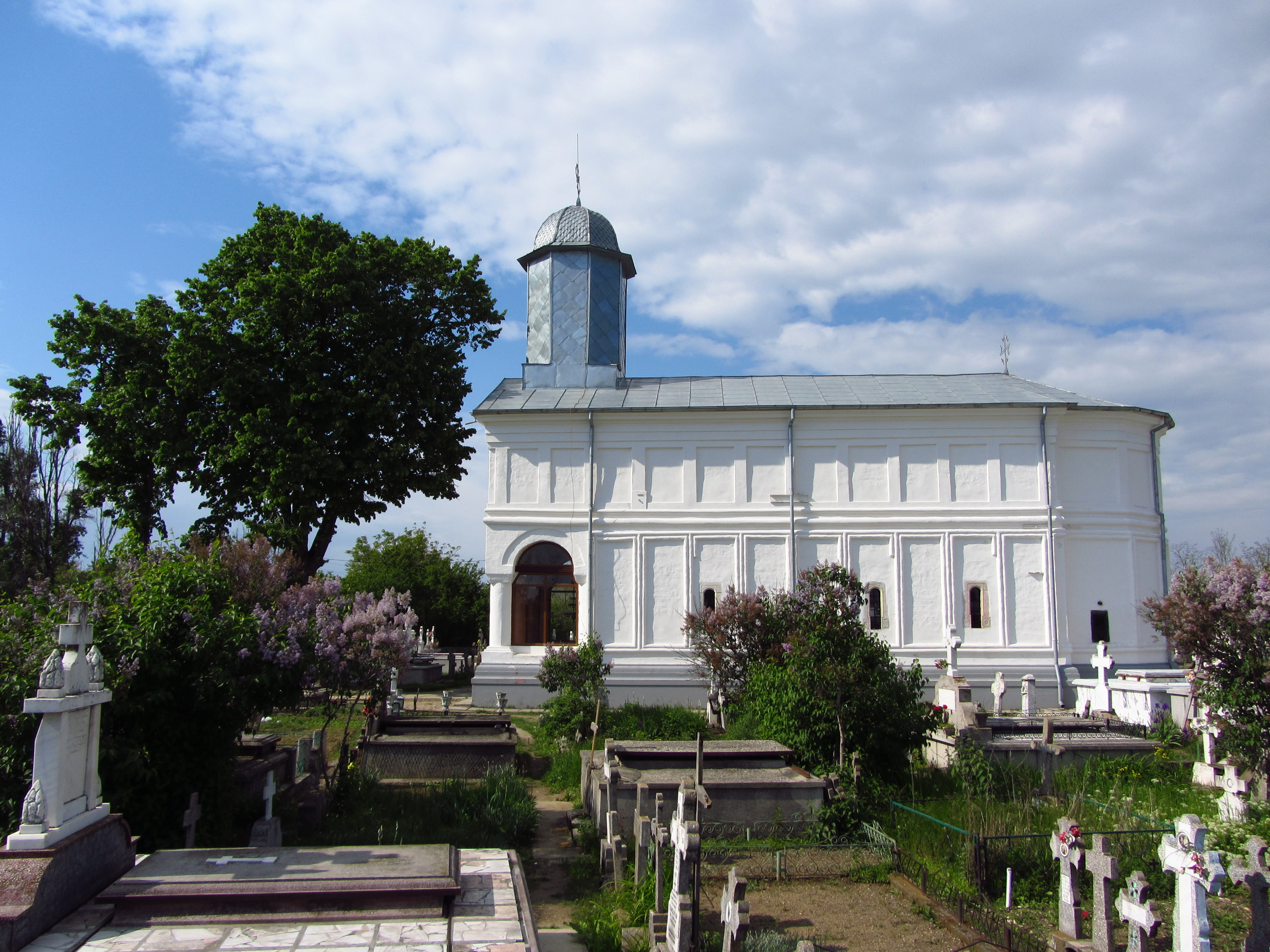
- Drugănești Annunciation Church in Stoenești

- Location in Romania
- Coordinates: 44°31′N 25°42′E
- Country: Romania
- County: Giurgiu

Government
  - Mayor (2020–2024): Constantin Dumitru (PNL)
- Area: 40.88 km^{2} (15.78 sq mi)
- Elevation: 115 m (377 ft)
- Population (2021-12-01): 9,456
  - Density: 231.3/km^{2} (599.1/sq mi)
- Time zone: UTC+02:00 (EET)
  - Summer (DST): UTC+03:00 (EEST)
- Postal code: 87078
- Area code: +(40) 246
- Vehicle reg.: GR
- Website: floresti-stoenesti.ro

Florești-Stoenești is a commune located in Giurgiu County, Muntenia, Romania. It is composed of three villages: Florești, Palanca, and Stoenești; the last one is the administrative centre.

The commune is located on the northern edge of the county, on the border with Dâmbovița County. It lies on the banks of the Sabar River and on the right bank of the Argeș River. Florești-Stoenești is crossed by the A1 motorway, on which it is served by an exit.

Historical population
Year	Pop.	±%
2002	8,843	—
2011	9,173	+3.7%
2021	9,456	+3.1%
Source: Census data

== Natives ==
- Alexandru Stănică (born 2000), footballer
