= Leordeni =

- Commune
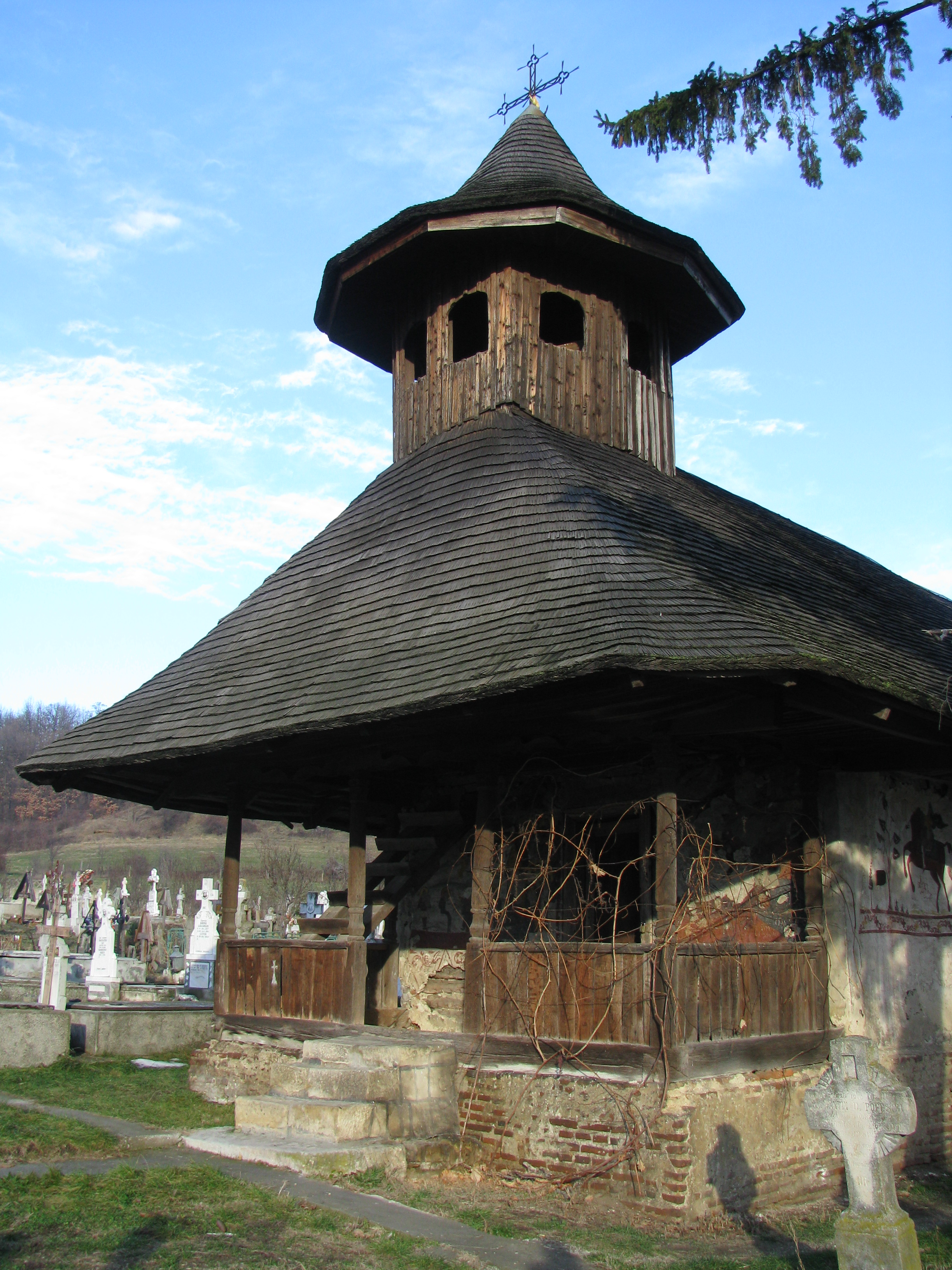
- Wooden church in Glâmbocata-Deal

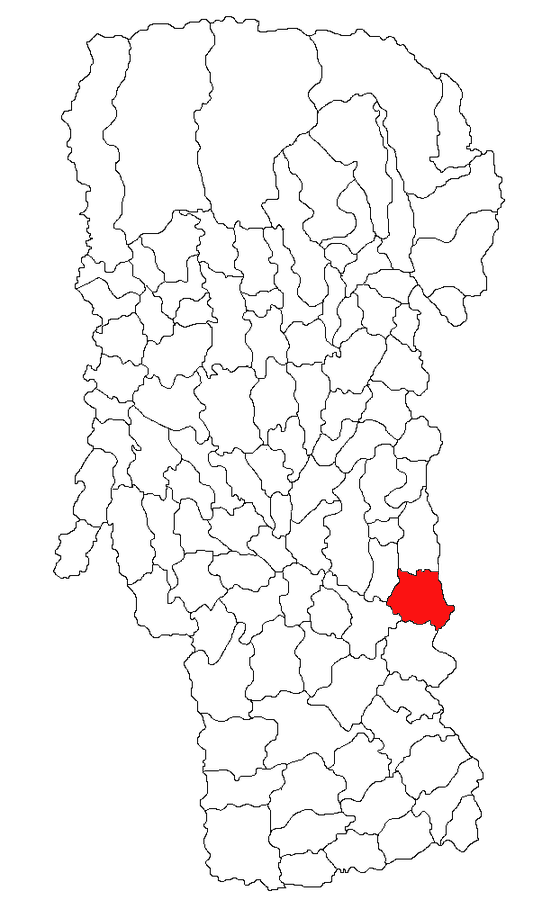
- Location in Argeș County

- Location in Romania
- Coordinates: 44°47′N 25°7′E
- Country: Romania
- County: Argeș

Government
  - Mayor (2024–2028): Marian Ibric (PSD)
- Elevation: 226 m (741 ft)
- Population (2021-12-01): 5,169
- Time zone: UTC+02:00 (EET)
  - Summer (DST): UTC+03:00 (EEST)
- Postal code: 117410
- Area code: +(40) 248
- Vehicle reg.: AG
- Website: www.cjarges.ro/en/web/leordeni

Leordeni is a commune in Argeș County, Muntenia, Romania. It is composed of fourteen villages: Baloteasca, Băila, Bântău, Budișteni, Ciolcești, Ciulnița, Cârciumărești, Cotu Malului, Glâmbocata, Glâmbocata-Deal, Glodu, Leordeni, Moara Mocanului, and Schitu Scoicești.

The commune is situated in the Wallachian Plain, at an altitude of 226 m (741 ft). It lies on the banks of the Argeș River and its left tributaries, the Budișteanca and the Sabar.

Leordeni is located in the eastern part of Argeș County, 24 km (15 mi) southeast of the county seat, Pitești, on the border with Dâmbovița County. It is crossed by national road DN7, which connects Bucharest, 93 km (58 mi) to the southeast, to Pitești. The Leordeni train station serves the CFR Line 901, which starts at Bucharest North, goes through Pitești, and ends in Craiova.

Founded in 1985, the Dinu Lipatti Memorial House is located in Ciolcești and is administered by the Argeș County Museum in Pitești.

== Demographics ==
Historical population
Year	Pop.	±%
2002	6,089	—
2011	5,994	−1.6%
2021	5,169	−13.8%
Source: Census data

At the 2021 census, the commune had 5,169 inhabitants, 93% of which were Romanians.

== People ==
- Constantin Fântâneru (1907 – 1975), writer (native)
- Nicolae Kretzulescu (1812 – 1900), physician and statesman (owner and long-time resident)
- Stroe Leurdeanu (c. 1600 – 1678 or 1679), statesman (owner and long-time resident)
- Scarlat Turnavitu (c. 1816 – 1876), politician (possible native, long-time resident)
