= Vărăști =

- Commune
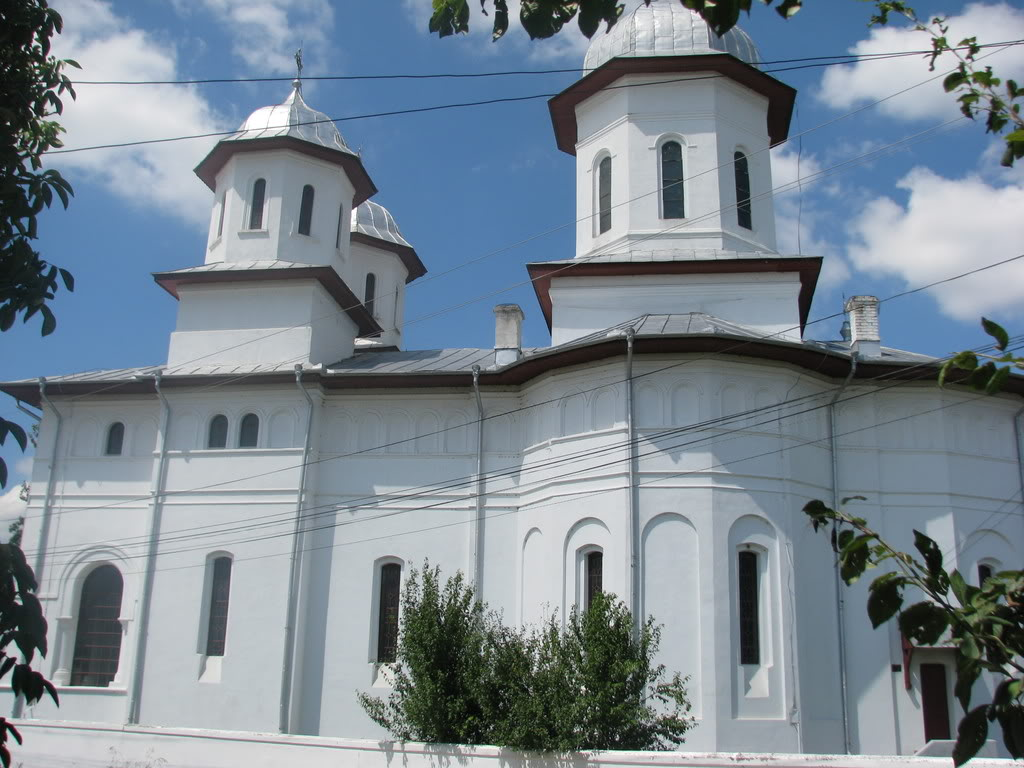
- Church in Vărăști

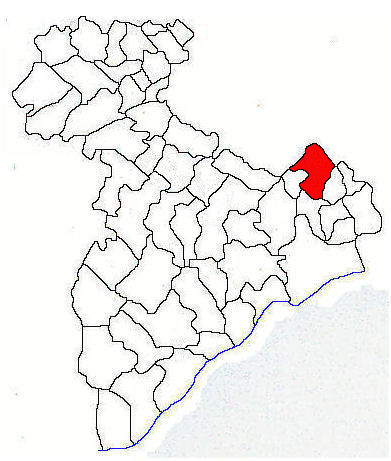
- Location in Giurgiu County

- Location in Romania
- Coordinates: 44°15′N 26°15′E
- Country: Romania
- County: Giurgiu

Government
  - Mayor (2020–2024): Adrian-Radu Măhălean (PSD)
- Area: 47.73 km^{2} (18.43 sq mi)
- Elevation: 51 m (167 ft)
- Population (2021-12-01): 5,819
  - Density: 121.9/km^{2} (315.8/sq mi)
- Time zone: UTC+02:00 (EET)
  - Summer (DST): UTC+03:00 (EEST)
- Postal code: 087245
- Area code: +(40) 246
- Vehicle reg.: GR
- Website: primariavarasti.ro

Vărăști is a commune located in Giurgiu County, Muntenia, Romania. It is composed of two villages, Dobreni and Vărăști.

Historical population
Year	Pop.	±%
2002	6,504	—
2011	6,317	−2.9%
2021	5,819	−7.9%
Source: Census data
