= Lungulețu =

- Commune
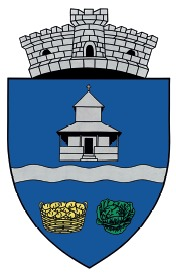
- Coat of arms

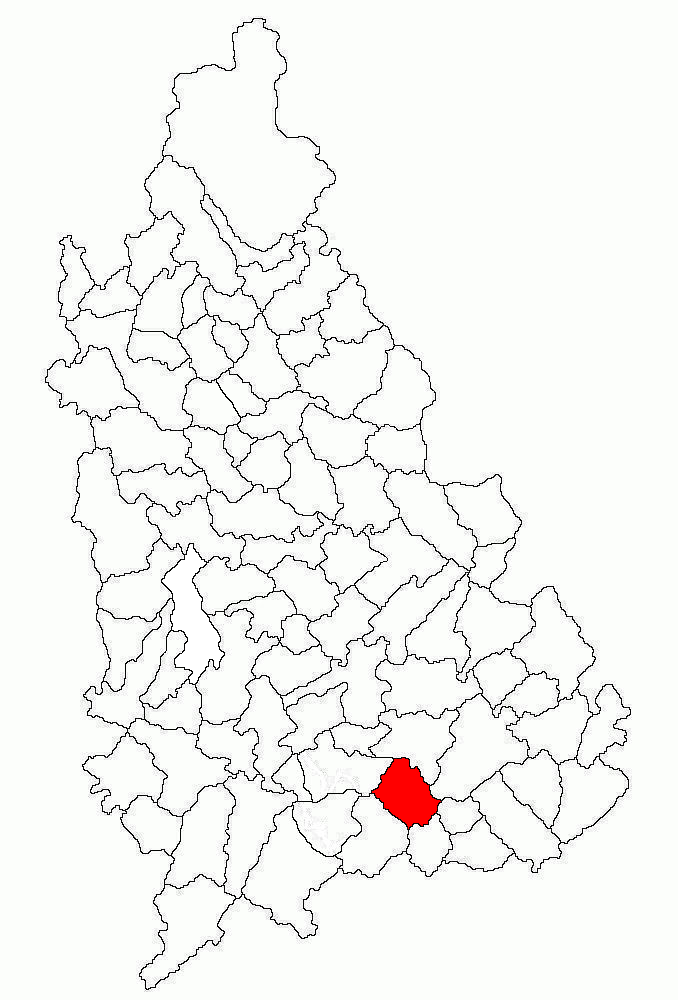
- Location in Dâmbovița County

- Location in Romania
- Coordinates: 44°37′N 25°39′E
- Country: Romania
- County: Dâmbovița

Government
  - Mayor (2024–2028): George Duțu (PSD)
- Area: 33.45 km^{2} (12.92 sq mi)
- Elevation: 137 m (449 ft)
- Population (2021-12-01): 5,289
  - Density: 160/km^{2} (410/sq mi)
- Time zone: EET/EEST (UTC+2/+3)
- Postal code: 137280
- Area code: +(40) 245
- Vehicle reg.: DB
- Website: primaria-lunguletu.ro

Lungulețu is a commune in Dâmbovița County, Muntenia, Romania with a population of 5,289 people as of 2021. It is composed of three villages: Lungulețu, Oreasca, and Serdanu.

Historical population
Year	Pop.	±%
2002	5,782	—
2011	5,586	−3.4%
2021	5,289	−5.3%
Source: Census data
