= Valea Dragului =

- Commune
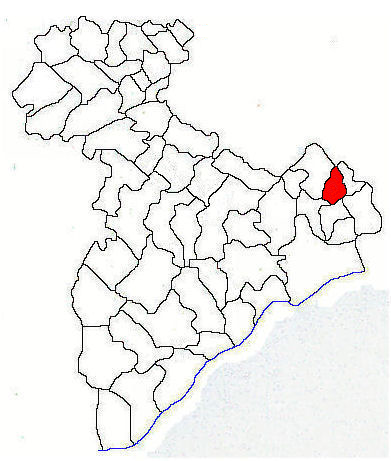
- Location in Giurgiu County

- Location in Romania
- Coordinates: 44°13′N 26°18′E
- Country: Romania
- County: Giurgiu

Government
  - Mayor (2020–2024): Marin Gh. Mototolea (PSD)
- Area: 33.1 km^{2} (12.8 sq mi)
- Elevation: 48 m (157 ft)
- Population (2021-12-01): 2,742
  - Density: 82.8/km^{2} (215/sq mi)
- Time zone: EET/EEST (UTC+2/+3)
- Postal code: 087240
- Area code: +(40) 246
- Vehicle reg.: GR
- Website: primariavaleadragului.ro

Valea Dragului is a commune located in Giurgiu County, Muntenia, Romania. It is composed of a single village, Valea Dragului. The former villages of Ciocoveni and Ghimpați were merged with Valea Dragului in 1968.

Historical population
| Year | Pop. | ±% |
|---|---|---|
| 2002 | 3,373 | — |
| 2011 | 3,230 | −4.2% |
| 2021 | 2,742 | −15.1% |
Source: Census data

== Natives ==
- Ion Voinescu (1929 – 2018), footballer
