= Produlești =

- Commune
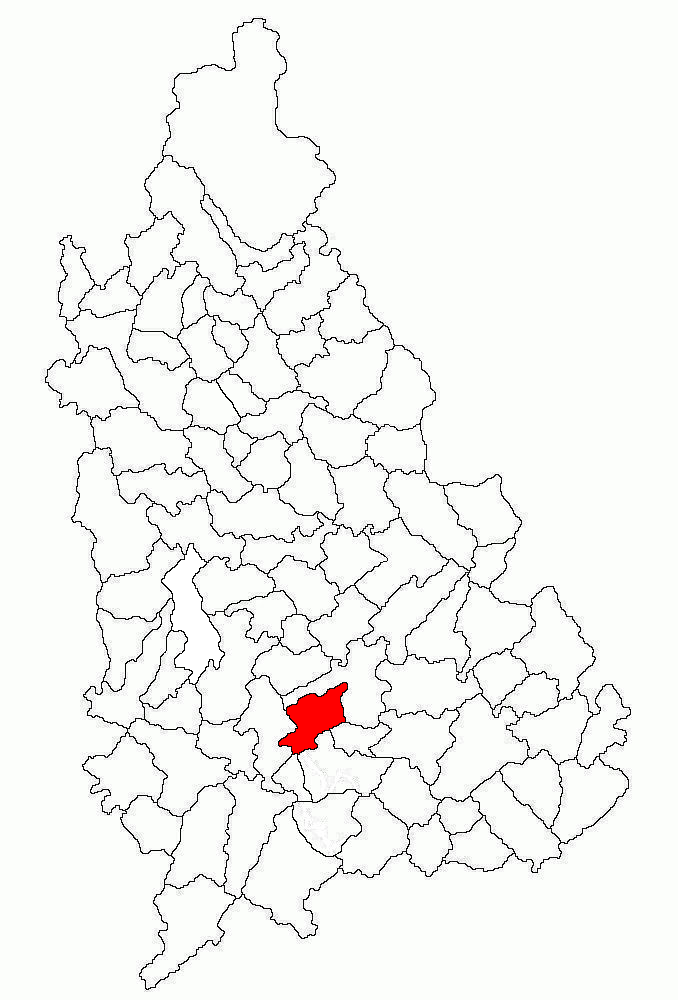
- Location in Dâmbovița County

- Location in Romania
- Coordinates: 44°42′N 25°30′E
- Country: Romania
- County: Dâmbovița

Government
  - Mayor (2024–2028): George Georgescu (PSD)
- Area: 29.55 km^{2} (11.41 sq mi)
- Elevation: 174 m (571 ft)
- Population (2021-12-01): 3,204
  - Density: 110/km^{2} (280/sq mi)
- Time zone: EET/EEST (UTC+2/+3)
- Postal code: 137375
- Area code: +(40) 245
- Vehicle reg.: DB
- Website: www.primariaprodulesti.ro

Produlești is a commune in Dâmbovița County, Muntenia, Romania with a population of 3,204 people as of 2021. It is composed of three villages: Broșteni, Costeștii din Deal, and Produlești.

Historical population
Year	Pop.	±%
2002	3,576	—
2011	3,427	−4.2%
2021	3,204	−6.5%
Source: Census data
