= Odobești, Dâmbovița =

Odobești
- Commune
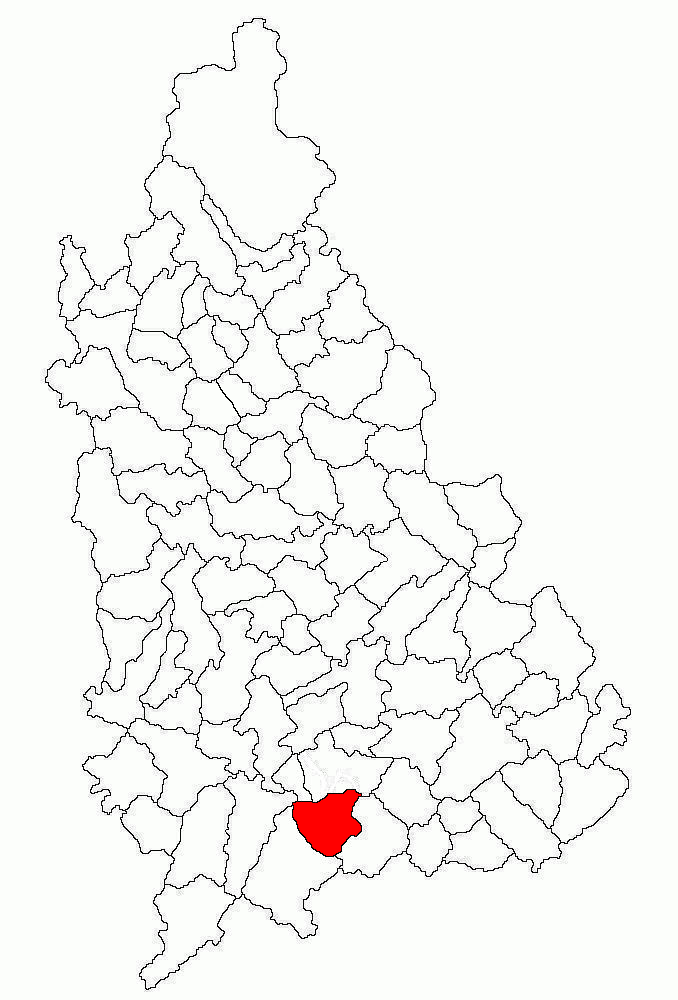
- Location in Dâmbovița County

- Location in Romania
- Coordinates: 44°37′N 25°34′E
- Country: Romania
- County: Dâmbovița

Government
  - Mayor (2024–2028): Ilie Radu (PSD)
- Area: 37.53 km^{2} (14.49 sq mi)
- Elevation: 146 m (479 ft)
- Population (2021-12-01): 4,946
  - Density: 130/km^{2} (340/sq mi)
- Time zone: EET/EEST (UTC+2/+3)
- Postal code: 137345
- Area code: +(40) 245
- Vehicle reg.: DB
- Website: primarieodobesti.ro

Odobești is a commune in Dâmbovița County, Muntenia, Romania with a population of 4,946 people as of 2021. It is composed of five villages: Brâncoveanu, Crovu, Miulești, Odobești, and Zidurile.

Historical population
Year	Pop.	±%
2002	5,273	—
2011	5,183	−1.7%
2021	4,946	−4.6%
Source: Census data
