= List of lakes of Romania =

This is a list of lakes of Romania. Notable lakes include Lake Sfânta Ana, the only crater lake in Romania, and Lake Razelm, the largest liman in the county.

Geography of Romania
Topography

Carpathians (peaks)
Plains & Delta
Islands

Hydrography

Rivers (Danube)
Lakes
Black Sea

Climate

== Major natural lakes ==
=== Glacial lakes ===
Name	Area (ha)	Volume (mill. m^{3})	County
Bucura	10.5	0.5	Hunedoara
Zănoaga Mare	9.0	1.0	Hunedoara
Bâlea	4.7	0.2	Sibiu
Câlcescu	3.0	0.1	Gorj

=== In volcanic craters ===
Name	Area (ha)	Volume (mill. m^{3})	County
Sfânta Ana	22.0	0.6	Harghita

=== Karstic lakes ===
Name	Area (ha)	Volume (mill. m^{3})	County
Zăton	20.0	1.0	Mehedinți
Iezerul Ighiu	5.3	0.2	Alba
Vintileasca	4.7	0.1	Vrancea

=== Behind natural dams ===
Name	Area (ha)	Volume (mill. m^{3})	County
Red Lake	12.6	0.7	Harghita
Bălătău	6.0	0.1	Bacău

=== In depressions ===
Name	Area (ha)	Volume (mill. m^{3})	County
Ianca	322	1.6	Brăila
Movila Miresii	180	4.5	Brăila
Lacul Sarat-Brăila	39	0.2	Brăila

=== On river banks ===
Name	Area (ha)	Volume (mill. m^{3})	County
Oltina	2,509	60	Constanța
Iezerul Mostiștei	1,860	160	Călărași
Balta Albă	1,012	5.1	Buzău-Brăila
Jirlau	890	5.6	Brăila
Amara-Buzău	600	3.6	Buzău
Snagov	575	17.3	Ilfov
Caldarusani	224	4.5	Ilfov
Hazarlac	168	0.8	Constanța
Amara-Ialomița	132	2.6	Ialomița

=== On river-maritime banks ===
Name	Area (ha)	Volume (mill. m^{3})	County
Tașaul	2,335	57	Constanța
Techirghiol	1,161	41.8	Constanța
Mangalia	261	15.7	Constanța
Tatlageac	178	14.0	Constanța

=== Lagoons ===
Name	Area (ha)	Volume (mill. m^{3})	County
Razelm Lake	41,500	909	Tulcea
Sinoe Lake	17,150	210.7	Constanța
Zmeica Lake	5,460	45.6	Tulcea
Siutghiol Lake	1,900	88.7	Constanța

=== In river valleys ===
Name	Area (ha)	Volume (mill. m^{3})	County
Brates	2,111	30.0	Galati
Bistret	1,867	28.0	Dolj
Suhaia	1,094	18.0	Teleorman
Lacul Rotund	219	2.0	Tulcea

=== In Danube Delta ===
Name	Area (ha)	Volume (mill. m^{3})	County
Dranov	2,170	21.7	Tulcea
Roșu	1,445	21.7	Tulcea
Gorgova	1,377.5	13.8	Tulcea
Lumina	1,367.5	20.5	Tulcea
Merhei	1,057.5	15.9	Tulcea
Furtuna	977.5	9.8	Tulcea
Malita	652.5	9.8	Tulcea

== Major reservoirs ==
Name	Area (ha)	Volume (mill. m^{3})	County
Iron Gates	70,000	2,400	Mehedinți
Ostrovu Mare	7,920	800	Mehedinți
Stânca-Costești	5,900	735	Botoșani
Izvorul Muntelui-Bicaz	3,100	1,130	Neamț
Strejești	2,204	202.7	Olt
Ipotești	1,692	110	Olt
Frunzaru	1,280	96.0	Olt
Izbiceni	1,095	74.0	Olt
Drăgănești	1,080	76.0	Olt
Mihăilești	1,013	76.3	Ilfov
Vidra	950	340	Vâlcea
Fântânele	884	212.9	Cluj
Vidraru	870	469	Argeș
Dracșani	500	6.1	Botoșani

== Major mountain lakes ==
Name	Mountain range	River basin	Type	Altitude (m)	Area (ha)	Maximum depth
Fântânele	Gilău	Someșul Cald	artificial (storage)	990	980	92
Vidraru	Făgăraș	Argeș	artificial (storage)	830	893	155
Vidra Lake	Parâng Mountains	Lotru	artificial (storage)	1,289	1,035	109
Bicaz	Ceahlău	Bistrița	artificial (storage)	513	3,000	90

== Other (minor) mountain lakes ==
Name of the lake	Mountain range	River basin	Type/origin	Altitude (m)	Area (ha)	Maximum depth
Firiza	Gutâi	Săsar	artificial (storage)	370	110	37.5
Bodi-Ferneziu	Gutâi	Săsar	artificial (storage)	425	1.6	5
Bodi I	Gutâi	Săsar	artificial (storage)	720	3.5	7
Bodi II	Gutâi	Săsar	artificial (storage)	700	1	4
Nistru	Gutâi	Săsar	artificial (storage)	340	1.2	5
Lighet	Gutâi	Lăpuș	artificial (storage)	340	3	5.5
Călinești	Oaș	Tur	artificial (storage)	150	160	9
Vinderel	Maramureș	Vișeu	periglacial and landslide	1,665	0.9	5.5
Lala Mare	Rodna	Bistrița (Siret)	glacial	1,815	0.6	2
Buhăiescu I	Rodna	Vișeu	glacial	1,905	0.05	2
Buhăiescu II	Rodna	Vișeu	glacial	1,890	0.2	5
Buhăiescu III	Rodna	Vișeu	glacial	1,820	0.1	1
Pietrosul	Rodna	Vișeu	glacial	1,825	0.5	2.5
Sadova	Obcina Feredeu	Moldova	landslide	915	1.5	5
Izvorul Măgurii	Bârgău	Ilva (Someș)	landslide	880	0.2	2
Zânelor	Bârgău	Bistrița (Someș)	landslide	1,290	0.3	2.5
Răciciș	Călimani	Toplița (Mureș)	landslide	1,730	0.1	3
Pângărați	Tarcău	Bistrița (Siret)	artificial	369	155	15
Vaduri	Tarcău	Bistrița (Siret)	artificial	360	115	15
Bâtca Doamnei	Tarcău	Bistrița (Siret)	artificial	324	235	16
Piatra Neamț	Tarcău	Bistrița (Siret)	artificial	313	16	4
Lacu Oii	Hășmaș	Bicaz	artificial	1,000	3	5
Pârâul Roșu	Hășmaș	Bicaz	artificial	1000	3	10
Mesteacăn	Hășmaș	Olt	artificial	900	15	16
Poiana Uzului	Ciuc	Uz	artificial	550	335	75
Bolătău	Ciuc	Uz	landslide	550	4.5	3
Lacu Verde	Vrancea	Șușița	landslide	1,040	0.5	4
Lacu Vulturilor	Buzău	Siriul Mare	periglacial	1,405	0.9	2.5
Lacu Negru	Buzău	Bâsca Mică	landslide	1,050	1.6	5
Mocearu	Buzău	Slănic (Buzău)	landslide	775	7	8
Hânsaru	Buzău	Bâsca	landslide	900	0.5	3
Paltinu	Bârsa	Doftana (Prahova)	artificial	650	215	107
Târlung	Bârsa	Olt	artificial	745	123	37
Scropoasa	Bucegi	Ialomița	artificial	1,197	6	15
Pucioasa	Bucegi	Ialomița	artificial	400	105	30
Iezer	Iezer	Râul Târgului	glacial	2,130	0.4	6.5
Zârna	Făgăraș-South	Râul Doamnei	glacial	2,050	0.5	0.5
Jgheburoasa	Făgăraș-South	Râul Doamnei	glacial	2,150	1	2
Hârtop I	Făgăraș-South	Râul Doamnei	glacial	2,230	0.3	2
Hârtop II	Făgăraș-South	Râul Doamnei	glacial	2,200	0.35	0.7
Hârtop V	Făgăraș-South	Râul Doamnei	glacial	2,100	1	3
Mânăstirii	Făgăraș-South	Râul Doamnei	glacial	2,165	0.5	2.5
Valea Rea	Făgăraș-South	Râul Doamnei	glacial	2,160	0.45	21
Scărișoara	Făgăraș-South	Râul Doamnei	glacial	2,200	1.2	9
Galbena II— III— IV	Făgăraș-South	Râul Doamnei	glacial	2,125/2,195	0.5	1
Văsălatu	Făgăraș-South	Râul Doamnei	artificial	860	2.5	14
Buda	Făgăraș-South	Buda (Argeș)	glacial	2,055	0.9	2
Podu Giurgiului	Făgăraș-South	Buda (Argeș)	glacial	2,220	0.2	3
Capra	Făgăraș-South	Argeș	glacial	2,230	1.8	8
Călțun	Făgăraș-South	Argeș	glacial	2,135	0.8	12
Oiești	Făgăraș-South	Argeș	artificial	505	40	4.5
Cumpăna	Făgăraș-South	Argeș	artificial	920	3	24
Dobroneagu	Făgăraș-South	Vâlsan	artificial	955	2	15
Urlea	Făgăraș-North	Breaza (Olt)	glacial	2,200	2	4.5
Podragu Mare	Făgăraș-North	Arpaș	glacial	2,110	2.8	15.5
Podragu Mic	Făgăraș-North	Arpaș	glacial	2,105	0.25	2
Podrăgel	Făgăraș-North	Arpaș	glacial	2,000	0.7	4
Doamnei	Făgăraș-North	Cârțișoara	glacial	1,865	0.3	1.6
Avrig	Făgăraș-North	Avrig	glacial	2,010	1.5	4.5
Iezeru Mare	Cindrel	Cibin	glacial	1,970	3.4	13
Iezeru Mic	Cindrel	Cibin	glacial	1,955	0.26	1.7
Gura Râului	Cindrel	Cibin	artificial	658	65	17
Sadu V	Cindrel	Sadu (Cibin)	artificial	1,150	72	68
Șureanu	Șureanu	Râul Mare (Cugir)	glacial	1,750	0.4	7.5
Oașa	Șureanu	Sebeș	artificial	1,260	453	90
Iezer Parâng	Parâng	Lotru	glacial	1,900	0.6	1.6
Câlcescu	Parâng	Lotru	glacial	1,930	3.2	10
Câlcescu I	Parâng	Lotru	glacial	1,980	0.55	4
Păsări	Parâng	Lotru	glacial	2,090	0.3	3
Zănoaga Mare	Parâng	Lotru	glacial	2,030	1	2
Balindru	Parâng	Lotru	artificial	1,030	6	27
Mălaia	Parâng	Lotru	artificial	480	46	22
Jidoaia	Parâng	Lotru	artificial	1,280	3.5	36
Iezer-Latorița	Parâng	Lotru	glacial	1,630	0.8	1.5
Galbenu	Parâng	Lotru	artificial	1,304	17	49
Petrimanu	Parâng	Lotru	artificial	1130	17	48
Ghereșu	Parâng	Jieț	glacial	1,980	0.35	5.5
Tăul fără Fund	Parâng	Jieț	glacial	1,980	3.6	17.5
Mândra	Parâng	Jieț	glacial	2,150	1.2	8.5
Zănoaga Stânii	Parâng	Jieț	glacial	1,910	0.6	1.5
Tăul Verde I	Parâng	Jieț	glacial	2,020	0.6	5.5
Tăul Verde III	Parâng	Jieț	glacial	2,005	0.05	1
Slivei	Parâng	Jieț	glacial	2,115	0.3	3
Tăul Înghețat	Parâng	Jieț	glacial	2,115	0.15	5
Mija	Parâng	Jieț	glacial	1,975	0.8	6.5
Lotrana	Parâng	Gilort	glacial	1,875	0.15	1
Peleaga	Retezat	Râul Mare (Strei)	glacial	2,112	1.7	4.6
Peleguța	Retezat	Râul Mare (Strei)	glacial	2,115	0.95	5
Lia	Retezat	Râul Mare (Strei)	glacial	1,910	1.35	4.5
Ana	Retezat	Râul Mare (Strei)	glacial	1,990	3.1	11.5
Viorica	Retezat	Râul Mare (Strei)	glacial	2,070	0.95	6.2
Florica	Retezat	Râul Mare (Strei)	glacial	2,090	0.8	2
Porții	Retezat	Râul Mare (Strei)	glacial	2,200	0.1	2
Agățat	Retezat	Râul Mare (Strei)	glacial	2,230	0.5	4
Bucura	Retezat	Râul Mare (Strei)	glacial	2,040	8.9	15.5
Slăvei	Retezat	Râul Mare (Strei)	glacial	1,930	3.3	6
Răsucit	Retezat	Râul Mare (Strei)	glacial	2,090	0.8	3
Urât	Retezat	Râul Mare (Strei)	glacial	2,090	0.4	1
Ascuns	Retezat	Râul Mare (Strei)	glacial	2,100	0.4	1.5
Judele	Retezat	Râul Mare (Strei)	glacial	2,135	0.8	4.5
Zănoaga	Retezat	Râul Mare (Strei)	glacial	2,010	6	29
Spurcat	Retezat	Râul Mare (Strei)	glacial	1,970	1.9	12.5
Cârlig 1	Retezat	Râul Mare (Strei)	glacial	1,935	0.35	3.5
Cârlig 2	Retezat	Râul Mare (Strei)	glacial	1,930	0.3	0.7
Negru	Retezat	Râul Mare (Strei)	glacial	2,010	4	26
Gemenele	Retezat	Râul Mare (Strei)	glacial	1,900	2.5	5.5
Iezilor	Retezat	Râul Mare (Strei)	glacial	2,090	0.2	3.5
Știrbului	Retezat	Râul Mare (Strei)	glacial	2,090	0.95	9
Șteviei	Retezat	Râul Mare (Strei)	glacial	2,070	0.7	10
Valea Rea	Retezat	Râul Doamnei	glacial	2,190	0.8	4
Galeșu	Retezat	Râul Doamnei	glacial	1,990	3.7	19.5
Țapului	Retezat	Bărbat	glacial	2,130	2.3	6
Păpușii	Retezat	Bărbat	glacial	2,160	0.4	4.9
Custura Mare	Retezat	Bărbat	glacial	2,165	2.8	7.5
Custura Mică	Retezat	Bărbat	glacial	2,135	0.8	7.5
Buta	Retezat	Jiu	glacial	1,720	0.3	4.5
Borăscu Mare	Godeanu	Râul Mare (Strei)	glacial	1855	0.35	3.5
Scărișoara	Godeanu	Râul Mare (Strei)	glacial	1,935	0.85	2
Gugu	Godeanu	Râul Mare (Strei)	glacial	1,990	0.4	3.5
Netiș	Țarcu	Râul Mare (Strei)	glacial	1,045	1.1	3
Bistra	Țarcu	Bistra (Timiș)	glacial	1,940	1.1	7
Valea lui Iovan	Godeanu	Cerna (Danube)	artificial	685	296	107
Valea de Pești	Vâlcan	Jiul de Vest	artificial	830	31	53
Tău fără Fund	Vâlcan	Jiul de Vest	landslide	620	0.3	10.5
Cinciș Cerna	Poiana Ruscă	Cerna (Mureș)	artificial	300	261	40
Buhui	Semenic	Caraș	artificial	640	10	12
Mărghitaș	Semenic	Caraș	artificial (storage)	645	4	6
Gozna	Semenic	Bârzava	artificial (storage)	610	66	40
Văliug	Semenic	Bârzava	artificial (storage)	500	12	25
Secu	Semenic	Bârzava	artificial (storage)	350	105	30
Trei Ape	Semenic	Timiș	artificial (storage)	835	53	30
Ferendia	Dognecea	Bârzava	artificial (storage)	265	0.5	5
Lacu Mic	Dognecea	Caraș	artificial (storage)	465	2.3	10
Lacu Mare	Dognecea	Caraș	artificial	400	6.2	9
Lacu Mare-Oravița	Anina	Caraș	artificial	315	1	4
Lacu Mic-Oravița	Anina	Caraș	artificial	285	0.8	10
Iezer Ighiel	Trascău	Ampoi	landslide	920	3.2	10
Țarinii	Metaliferi	Abrud	artificial	1000	0.6	10
Lacu Mare	Metaliferi	Abrud	artificial	930	2.5	5
Anghel	Metaliferi	Abrud	artificial	850	0.6	4
Brazi	Metaliferi	Abrud	artificial	930	0.6	6
Cartuș	Metaliferi	Abrud	artificial	—	0.3	2
Corali	Metaliferi	Abrud	artificial	930	0.8	8
Găurari	Metaliferi	Abrud	artificial	—	0.4	2
Seliște	Metaliferi	Abrud	artificial	—	0.4	2
Muntari	Metaliferi	Abrud	artificial	—	0.2	2
Făerag	Metaliferi	Mureș	artificial	465	3.4	2
Caraciu	Metaliferi	Mureș	artificial	680	1.4	7
Leșu	Bihor	Iad	artificial	560	147	56
Toplița	Bihor	Crișul Negru	artificial	300	8	15
Gilău	Gilău	Someșul Mic	artificial	410	70	9
Someșu Cald	Gilău	Someșul Cald	artificial (storage)	515	78	34
Tarnița	Gilău	Someșul Cald	artificial	620	215	97
Izvorul Alb	Gilău	Someșul Cald	artificial	1,010	1	6
Izvorul Băii	Gilău	Someșul Rece	artificial	1,035	7	43
Negruța	Gilău	Someșul Rece	artificial	1,055	0.5	2
Blăjoaia	Gilău	Someșul Rece	artificial	1,200	1	6
Iara	Gilău	Arieș	artificial (storage)	1,055	1	8
Șoimu	Gilău	Arieș	artificial (storage)	1,042	0.2	7

== Other lakes ==
- Lake Sărat: "Sărat" = "Salty"; at its bottom is still a crust of salt. Near Brăila. A small beach.
- Lake Someșu Rece: it is located in Cluj County

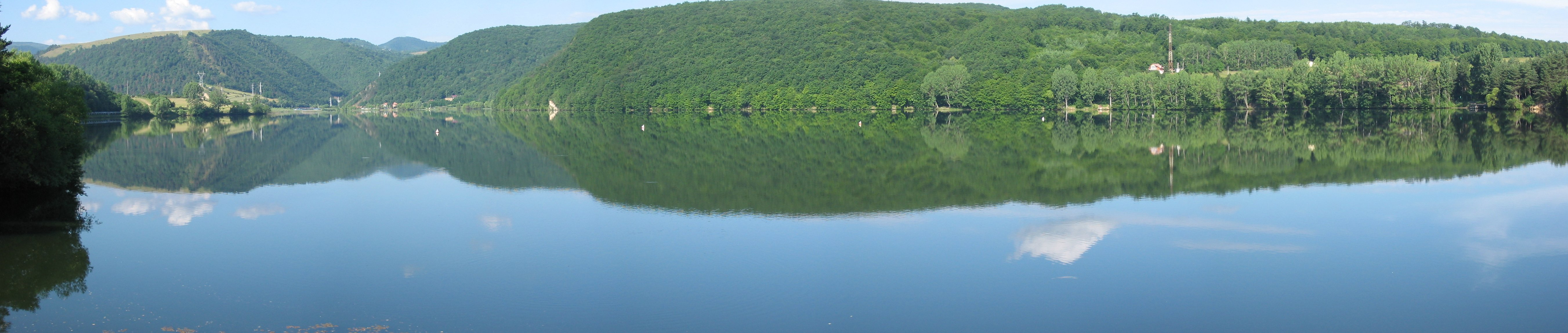
Someșu Rece Lake

== See also ==
- List of lakes in Bucharest
- Ocna Sibiului mine#Lakes of the salt mine
