= List of mountains in Romania =

Geography of Romania
Topography

Carpathians (peaks)
Plains & Delta
Islands

Hydrography

Rivers (Danube)
Lakes
Black Sea

Climate

This is a partial list of mountains in Romania. There are 12 peaks over 2,500 m in Romania. Seven of the 12 are located in the Făgăraș Mountains.

Peak	Mountain Range	County or Counties	Height (m)
Moldoveanu Peak	Făgăraș Mountains	Argeș	2,544
Negoiu Peak	Făgăraș Mountains	Sibiu	2,535
Viștea Mare	Făgăraș Mountains	Brașov	2,527
Parângu Mare	Parâng Mountains	Gorj; Hunedoara	2,519
Lespezi	Făgăraș Mountains	Sibiu	2,517
Omu Peak	Bucegi Mountains	Prahova; Brașov; Dâmbovița	2,514
Peleaga	Retezat Mountains	Hunedoara	2,509
Păpușa	Retezat Mountains	Hunedoara	2,508
Vânătarea lui Buteanu	Făgăraș Mountains	Sibiu	2,507
Hartopul Darei (Dara's Hollow)	Făgăraș Mountains		2,506
Cornul Călțunului	Făgăraș Mountains	Sibiu	2,505
Bucura Peak	Bucegi Mountains	Prahova; Brașov; Dâmbovița	2,503
Dara	Făgăraș Mountains		2,500
Retezat Peak	Retezat Mountains	Hunedoara	2,482
Iezeru Mare	Iezer Mountains	Argeș	2,462
Pietrosul Rodnei	Rodna Mountains	Maramureș	2,303
Gugu Peak	Godeanu Mountains	Caraș-Severin; Hunedoara	2,291
Suru Peak	Făgăraș Mountains	Sibiu	2,283
Ineu Peak	Rodna Mountains	Bistrița-Năsăud	2,279
Cindrel Peak	Cindrel Mountains	Sibiu	2,244
Șteflești	Lotru	Sibiu; Vâlcea	2,242
La Om (Piscul Baciului)	Piatra Craiului	Brașov	2,238
Godeanu Peak	Godeanu Mountains	Caraș-Severin; Gorj	2,229
Căleanu	Țarcu Mountains	Caraș-Severin	2,190
Țarcu Peak	Țarcu Mountains	Caraș-Severin	2,190
Leaota Peak	Leaota Mountains	Dâmbovița; Argeș	2,133
Vârfu lui Pătru	Șureanu Mountains	Hunedoara	2,130
Ursu Peak	Căpățâna Mountains	Vâlcea	2,124
Pietrosu Peak	Călimani Mountains	Suceava; Mureș	2,100
Șureanu Peak	Șureanu Mountains	Hunedoara	2,059
Farcău Peak	Maramureș Mountains	Maramureș	1,956
Ciucaș Peak	Ciucaș Mountains	Brașov; Prahova	1,954
Toroiaga	Maramureș Mountains	Maramureș	1,930
Ocolașu Mare	Ceahlău Massif	Neamț	1,907
Mount Toaca	Ceahlău Massif	Neamț	1,900
Straja	Vâlcan	Gorj; Hunedoara	1,868
Budacu	Bistrița	Neamț; Suceava	1,859
Giumalău	Giumalău-Rarău Mountains	Suceava	1,856
Cucurbăta Mare	Bihor Mountains	Bihor, Alba	1,849
Vârful Bran	Țibleș	Maramureș; Bistrița-Năsăud	1,839
Vlădeasa	Vlădeasa	Cluj	1,836
Muntele Mare	Muntele Mare	Alba; Cluj	1,826
Harghita Mădăraș	Harghita Mountains	Harghita	1,800
Hășmașu Mare	Hășmaș	Harghita; Neamț	1,792
Pietrosu Peak	Bistrița Mountains	Suceava	1,791
Goru	Vrancea Mountains	Buzău; Vrancea	1,784
Lăcăuț	Vrancea Mountains	Covasna; Vrancea	1,777
Saca Peak	Gurghiu Mountains	Mureș	1,776
Penteleu	Penteleu	Buzău	1,772
Vlașcu Mic	Munții Cernei	Caraș-Severin	1,733
Cozia Peak	Cozia Mountains	Vâlcea	1,668
Grinduș	Tarcău	Bacău	1,664
Rarău	Giumalău-Rarău Mountains	Suceava	1,650
Nemira	Nemira	Bacău	1,649
Heniu Mare	Bârgău Mountains	Bistrița-Năsăud	1,611
Lucina	Obcina Mestecăniș	Suceava	1,588
Mount Cucu	Harghita Mountains	Harghita; Covasna	1,558
Bivolu	Stânișoara	Neamț	1,530
Pașcani	Obcina Feredeu	Suceava	1,495
Vârfu lui Stan	Mehedinți Mountains	Mehedinți	1,466
Piatra Goznei	Semenic Mountains	Caraș-Severin	1,447
Gutâi Peak	Gutâi Mountains	Maramureș	1,443
Poienița Peak	Munții Metaliferi	Alba	1,437
Padeș Peak	Poiana Ruscă	Timiș; Caraș-Severin	1,374
Dâmbău	Trascău Mountains	Alba	1,369
Igniș	Gutâi	Maramureș	1,307
Ciomatu	Bodoc	Harghita	1,301
Detunata	Munții Metaliferi	Alba	1,258
Svinecea Mare	Almăj	Caraș-Severin	1,224
Leordiș	Munții Aninei	Caraș-Severin	1,160
Pleșu	Codru Moma	Arad; Bihor	1,112
Vârfu Cetății	Perșani	Brașov	1,104
Măgura Priei	Meseș	Sălaj	996
Muntele Cetatuia	Făgăraș Mountains	Argeș	850
Drocea	Zarand Mountains	Arad	836
Țuțuiatu	Măcin	Tulcea	467
