= Podragu River =

Podragu River may refer to:

- Podragu, a tributary of the Arpaș in Brașov County
- Podragul, a tributary of the Lotrioara in Sibiu County
