= Romanian Carpathians =

Section of the Carpathian Mountains in Romania

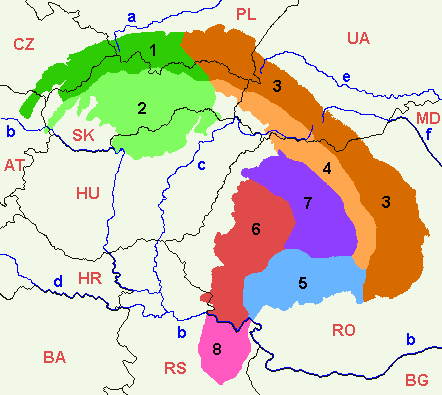
Map of the main divisions of the Carpathians, including sections in Romania: 3. Outer Eastern Carpathians; 4. Inner Eastern Carpathians; 5. Southern Carpathians; 6. Western Romanian Carpathians; 7. Transylvanian Plateau

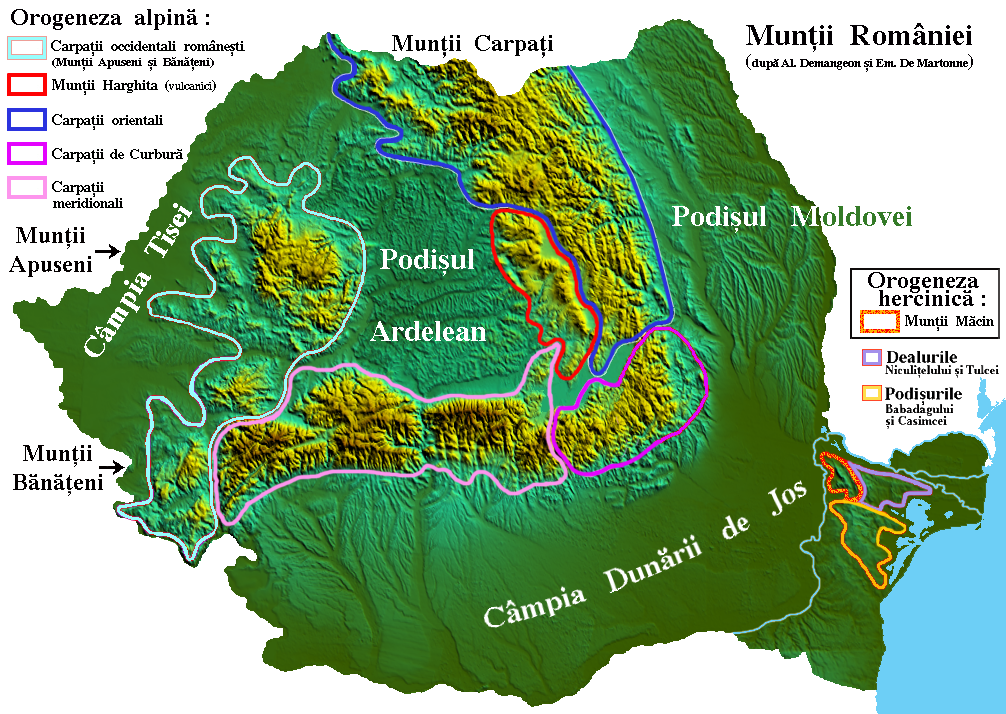
Divisions of the Romanian Carpathians

The Romanian Carpathians (Romanian: Carpații românești) are a section of the Carpathian Mountains, within the borders of modern Romania. The Carpathians are a "subsystem" of the Alps-Himalaya System and are further divided into "provinces" and "subprovinces".

This is an overview of the geological subdivisions of the Romanian section of the Carpathian Mountains. The broadest divisions are shown in the map on the right. The last level of the division, i.e. the actual mountain ranges and basins, is usually called "units". The lowest-level detail for those units is maintained on separate pages.

== Naming conventions ==
Traditional Romanian naming conventions differ from this list. In Romania, it is usual to divide the Eastern Carpathians in Romanian territory into three geographical groups (North, Centre, South), instead in Outer and Inner Eastern Carpathians.

The Transylvanian Plateau is encircled by, and geologically a part of, the Carpathians, but it is not a mountainous region and its inclusion is disputed in some sources. Its features are included below.

The Outer Carpathian Depressions lay outside the broad arc of the entire formation and are usually listed as part of the individual divisions of the Carpathian Mountains, i.e. of Western Carpathians, Eastern Carpathians etc.

== Romanian divisions ==
The Romanian Carpathians chain is classified, according to the geomorphological and geological differences, into three major morphotectonic units:

- Eastern Romanian Carpathians (Carpații Orientali) - with 3 main groups subdivided into 40 mountain groups
- Southern Carpathians (Carpații Meridionali) - with 4 main groups subdivided into 24 mountain groups
- Western Romanian Carpathians (Carpații Occidentali Românești) - with 3 main groups subdivided into 18 mountain groups

=== Eastern Romanian Carpathians ===
Geography of Romania
Topography

Carpathians (peaks)
Plains & Delta
Islands

Hydrography

Rivers (Danube)
Lakes
Black Sea

Climate

==== Romanian classification ====
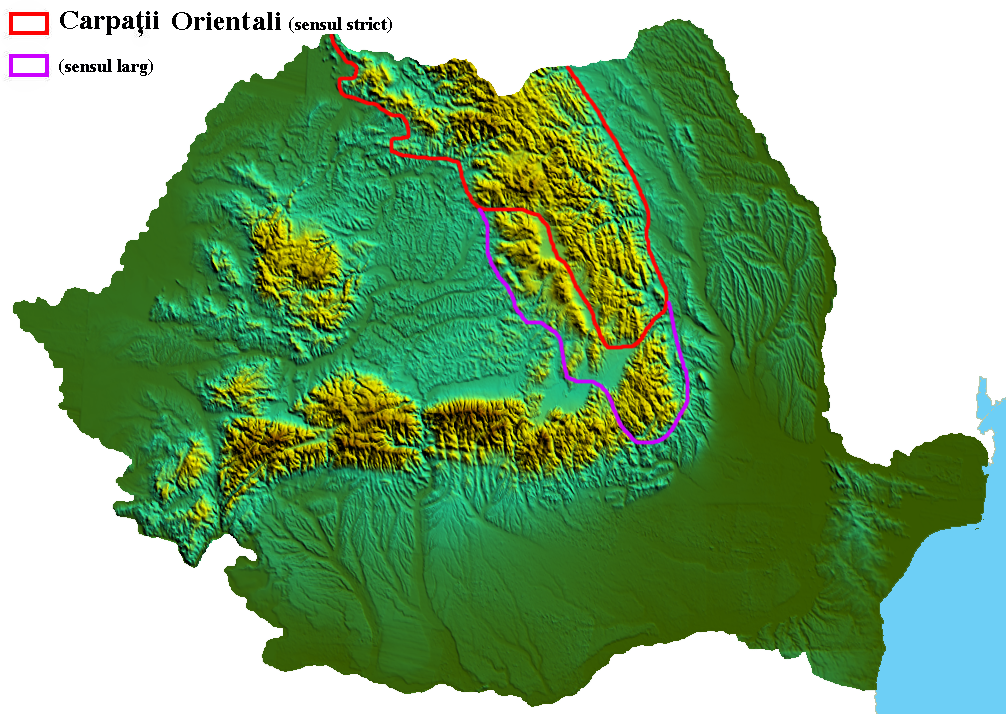
Eastern Carpathians in Romania

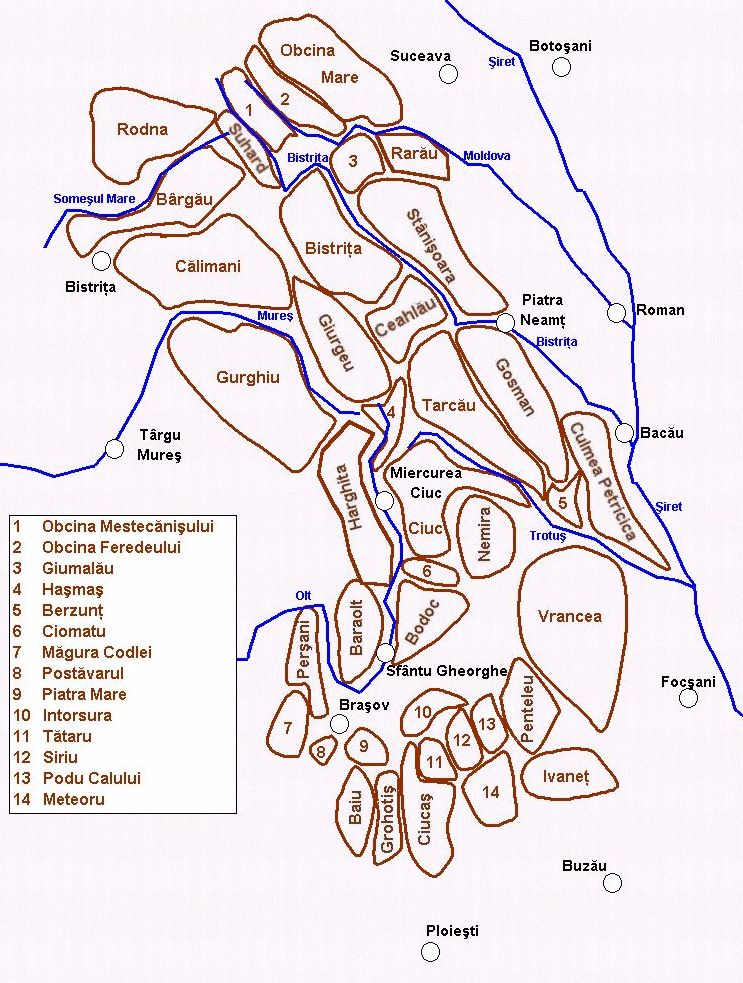
Chart of Eastern Carpathians in Romania

The Eastern Carpathians are divided into three geographical groups; the Romanian approach is shown by adding the following abbreviations to the names of units within Romania:

- MMB = Maramureș-Bukovinian Carpathians (Munții Carpați ai Maramureșului și Bucovinei) (North group)
- MMT = Moldavian-Transylvanian Carpathians (Munții Carpați Moldo-Transilvani) (Centre group)
- MC = Curvature Carpathians (Munții Carpați de Curbură) (South group)

==== Other classification ====
- Outer Eastern Carpathians
  - Moldavian-Muntenian Carpathians
- Inner Eastern Carpathians
  - "Volcanic Ridge" (the Romanian portion of the Vihorlat-Gutin Area group)
  - Bistrița Mountains
  - Căliman-Harghita Mountains
  - Giurgeu-Brașov Depression

=== Southern Romanian Carpathians ===
- Bucegi Mountains Group
- Făgăraș Mountains group
- Parâng Mountains group
- Retezat-Godeanu Mountains group

=== Western Romanian Carpathians ===
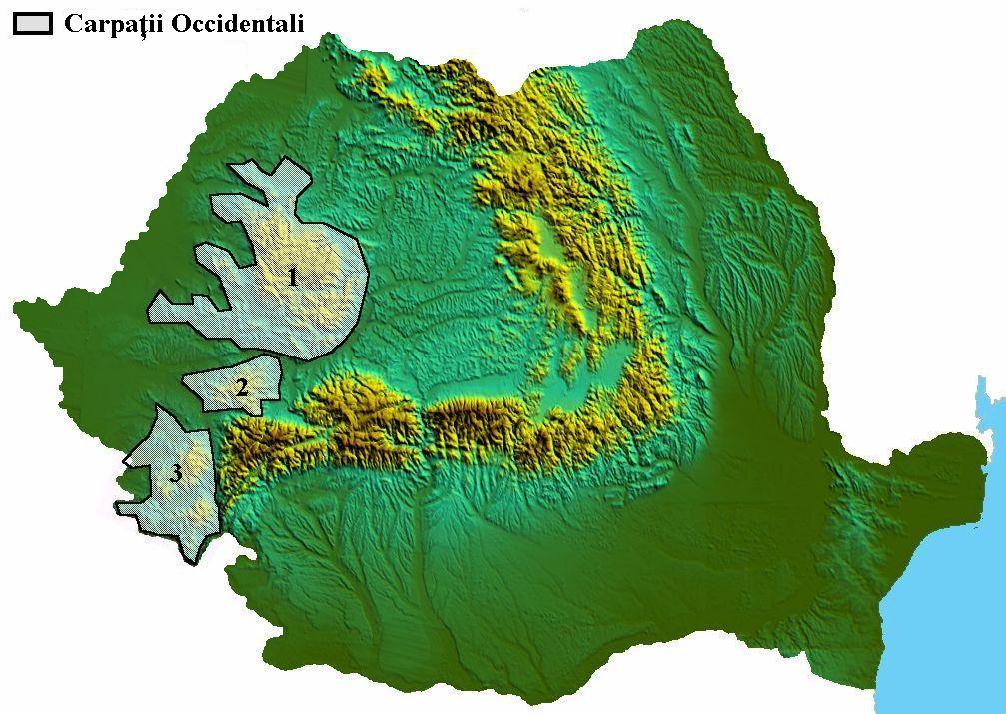
Western Romanian Carpathians

- Apuseni Mountains
- Poiana Ruscă Mountains
- Banat Mountains

== See also ==
- List of mountains in Romania
- Bukovinian Subcarpathians
- Divisions of the Carpathians
