= Topography of Romania =

Aspect of the geography of Romania

Geography of Romania
Topography

Carpathians (peaks)
Plains & Delta
Islands

Hydrography

Rivers (Danube)
Lakes
Black Sea

Climate

Romania's landscape is almost evenly divided among mountains (31 percent), hills (33 percent), and plains (36 percent). These varied relief forms spread rather symmetrically from the Carpathian Mountains, which reach elevations of more than 2,500 metres, to the Danube Delta, which sits at an average of 0.52 metres above sea level.

== Romanian Carpathians ==
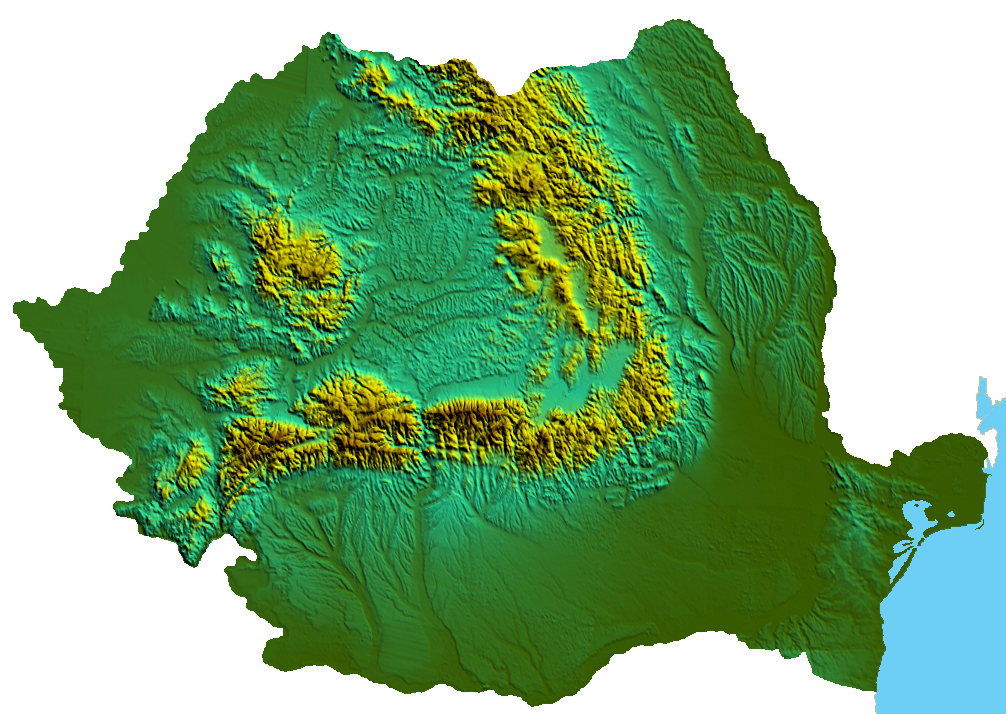
Physical map of Romania showing the Carpathian Mountains

The arc of the Carpathians extends over 1,000 km through the center of the country, covering an area of 69,800 square km. These mountains are of low to medium altitude and are no wider than 100 km. They are deeply fragmented by longitudinal and transverse valleys and crossed by several major rivers. These features and the fact that there are many summit passes—some at altitudes up to 2,256 metres—have made the Carpathians less of a barrier to movement than have other European ranges. Another distinguishing feature is the many eroded platforms that provide tableland at relatively high altitudes. There are permanent settlements here at above 1,200 metres.

Romania's Carpathians are differentiated into three ranges: the Eastern Carpathians, the Southern Carpathians or Transylvanian Alps, and the Western Carpathians. Each of these ranges has important distinguishing features. The Eastern Carpathians are composed of three parallel ridges that run from northwest to southeast. The westernmost ridge is an extinct volcanic range with many preserved cones and craters. The range has many large depressions, in the largest of which the city of Braşov is situated. Important mining and industrial centers as well as agricultural areas are found within these depressions. The Eastern Carpathians are covered with forests—some 32 percent of the country's woodlands are there. They also contain important ore deposits, including gold and silver, and their mineral water springs feed numerous health resorts.

The Southern Carpathians offer the highest peaks at Moldoveanu Peak (2,544 metres) and Negoiu (2,535 meters) and more than 150 glacial lakes. They have large grassland areas and some woodlands but few large depressions and subsoil resources. The region was crisscrossed by an ancient network of trans-Carpathian roads, and vestiges of the old Roman Way are still visible. Numerous passes and the valleys of the Olt, Jiu, and Danube rivers provide routes for roads and railways through the mountains.

The Western Carpathians are the lowest of the three ranges and are fragmented by many deep structural depressions. They have historically functioned as "gates," which allow easy passage but can be readily defended. The most famous of these is the Iron Gate on the Danube. The Western Carpathians are the most densely settled, and it is in the northernmost area of this range, the Apuseni Mountains, that permanent settlements can be found at the highest altitudes.

== Hills, plateaus and plains ==
Enclosed within the great arc of the Carpathians lie the undulating plains and low hills of the Transylvanian Plateau--the largest tableland in the country and the center of Romania. This important agricultural region also contains large deposits of methane gas and salt. To the south and east of the Carpathians, the Sub-Carpathians form a fringe of rolling terrain ranging from 396 to 1,006 metres in elevation. This terrain is matched in the west by the slightly lower Western Hills. The symmetry of Romania's relief continues with the Getic Tableland to the south of the Sub-Carpathians, the Moldavian Tableland in the east between the Sub-Carpathians and the Prut River, and the Dobrujan Tableland in the southeast between the Danube and the Black Sea. The Sub-Carpathians and the tableland areas provide good conditions for human settlement and are important areas for fruit growing, viticulture, and other agricultural activity. They also contain large deposits of brown coal and natural gas.

Beyond the Carpathian foothills and tablelands, the plains spread south and west. In the southern parts of the country, the lower Danube Plain is divided by the Olt River; east of the river lies the Romanian Plain, and to the west is the Oltenian or Western Plain. The land here is rich with chernozemic soils and forms Romania's most important farming region. Irrigation is widely used, and marshlands in the Danube's floodplain have been diked and drained to provide additional tillable land.

Romania's lowest land is found on the northern edge of the Dobruja region in the Danube Delta. The delta is a triangular swampy area of marshes, floating reed islands, and sandbanks, where the Danube ends its trek of almost 3,000 km and divides into three frayed branches before emptying into the Black Sea. The Danube Delta provides a large part of the country's fish production, and its reeds are used to manufacture cellulose. The region also serves as a nature preserve for rare species of plant and animal life including migratory birds.

After entering the country in the southwest at Bazias, the Danube travels some 1,000 km through or along Romanian territory, forming the southern frontier with Serbia and Bulgaria. Virtually all of the country's rivers are tributaries of the Danube, either directly or indirectly, and by the time the Danube's course ends in the Black Sea, they account for nearly 40 percent of the total discharge. The most important of these rivers are the Mureș, the Olt, the Prut, the Siret, the Ialomița, the Someș, and the Argeș. Romania's rivers primarily flow east, west, and south from the central crown of the Carpathians. They are fed by rainfall and melting snow, which causes considerable fluctuation in discharge and occasionally catastrophic flooding. In the east, river waters are collected by the Siret and the Prut. In the south, the rivers flow directly into the Danube, and in the west, waters are collected by the Tisza on Hungarian territory.

The Danube is by far Romania's most important river, not only for transportation, but also for the production of hydroelectric power. One of Europe's largest hydroelectric stations is located at the Iron Gates, where the Danube surges through the Carpathian gorges. The Danube is an important water route for domestic shipping, as well as international trade. It is navigable for river vessels along its entire Romanian course and for seagoing ships as far as the port of Brăila. An obvious problem with the use of the Danube for inland transportation is its remoteness from most of the major industrial centres. Moreover, marshy banks and perennial flooding impede navigation in some areas.
