= List of islands of Romania =

Geography of Romania
Topography

Carpathians (peaks)
Plains & Delta
Islands

Hydrography

Rivers (Danube)
Lakes
Black Sea

Climate

This is a list of islands of Romania.

- Balta Ialomiței
- Insula Ada Kaleh
- Insula Ceaplace
- Insula Golu
- Insula Mare a Brăilei
- Insula Mică a Brăilei
- Insula Moldova Veche
- Insula Popina
- Insula Sacalinu Mic
- Insula Sacalinu Mare
- Insula Şimian
- Insula Belina
- Insula Cighineaua
- Insula Ciobanu
- Insula K
- Ostrovul Calinovăţ
- Ostrovul Moldova Veche
- Ostrovul Braniştei
- Ostrovul Gârla Mare
- Ostrovul Chichinete
- Ostrovu Mare
- Ostrovu Acalia
- Ostrovu Pietriş
- Ostrovu Vană
- Ostrovu Gâtanului
- Ostrovu Copaniţa
- Ostrovu Păpădiei
- Ostrovu Băloiu
- Ostrovul Calnovăţ with Ostrovul Mare, Islaz
- Ostrovu Mic
- Ostrovu Dinu
- Ostrovu Urucu
- Ostrovu Cioroiu
- Ostrovu Mocanului
- Ostrovu Elena
- Ostrovul Ciocăneşti
- Ostrovu Fermecat
- Ostrovu Lung
- Ostrovu Găzarului
- Ostrovu Nou
- Ostrovu Alionte
- Ostrovu Balaban
- Ostrovu Ruptura
- Ostrovu Gâştei
- Insula Vărsăturii
- Ostrovul Crăcănel
- Ostrovu Orbului
- Iezeru Popii
- Insula Calia
- Insula Fundul Mare
- Insula Arapului
- Ostrovu Tătaru
- Ostrovul Cernovca
- Ostrovu Babina

== Former islands ==
- Ada Kaleh
- Haţeg Island
- Sacalinu Mic Island
- Sacalinu Mare Island

== See also ==
- List of islands
