= List of rivers of Romania =

Geography of Romania
Topography

Carpathians (peaks)
Plains & Delta
Islands

Hydrography

Rivers (Danube)
Lakes
Black Sea

Climate

This is a list of rivers of Romania which entirely or partially flow through Romania.

== Longest rivers ==
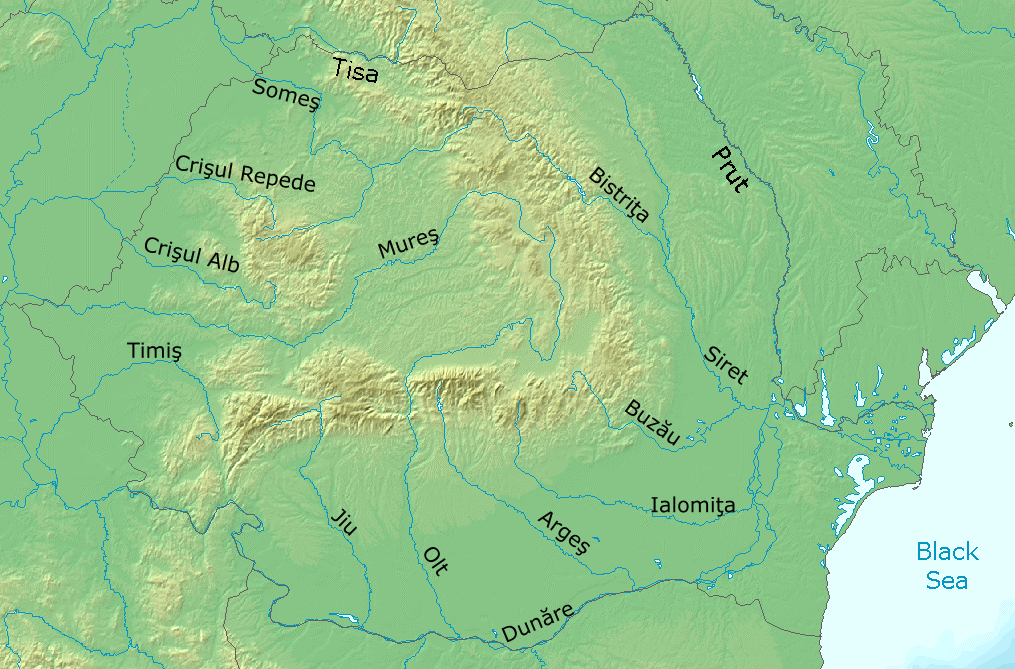
Major rivers of Romania

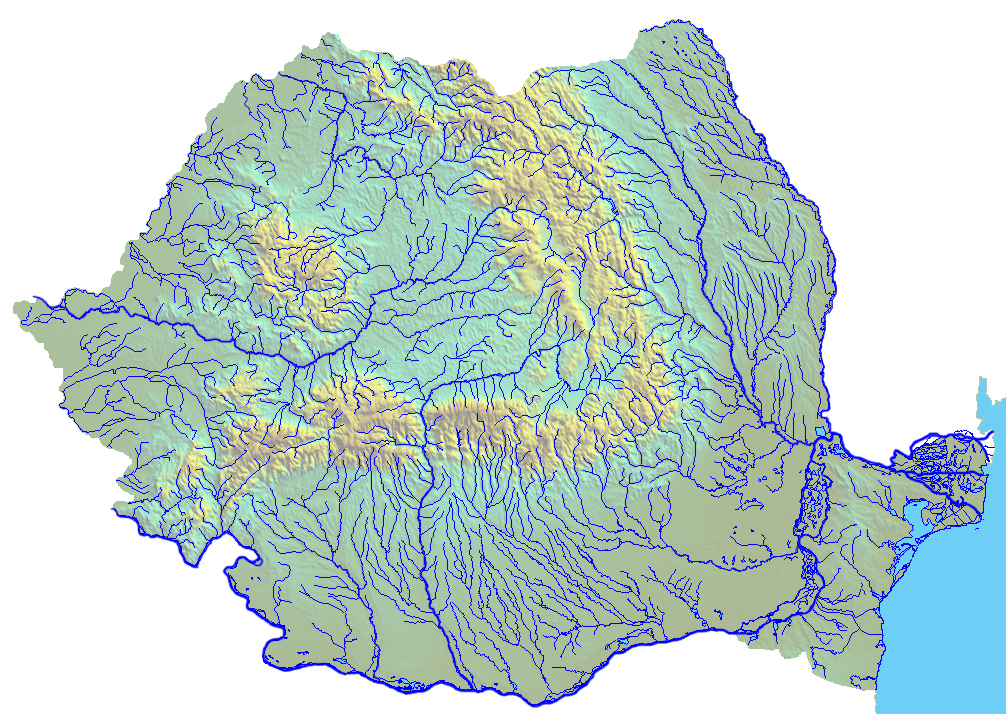
Hydrographical map of Romania

The length and drainage area represent only the part of the river within Romania.

River name	Length of the river (km)	Drainage area (km^{2})	Water resources (mil. m^{3}/year)
Danube	1,075	33,250	20,000
Mureș	761	27,890	1,044
Prut	742	10,990	726
Olt	615	24,050	1,682
Siret	559	42,890	1,956
Ialomița	417	10,350	430
Someș	376	15,740	715
Argeș	350	12,550	1,672
Jiu	339	10,080	2,109
Buzău	302	5,264	
Dâmbovița	286	2,824	
Bistrița	283	7,039	
Jijia	275	5,757	
Târnava	246	6,253	
Timiș	244	5,673	
Crișul Alb	234	4,240	
Vedea	224	5,430	
Târnava Mare	223	3,666	
Moldova	213	4,299	
Bârlad	207	7,220	
Târnava Mică	196	2,071	
Prahova	193	3,738	
Neajlov	186	3,720	
Olteț	185	2,663	
Someșul Mic	178	3,773	
Suceava	173	2,298	
Bega	170	2,362	
Arieș	166	3,005	
Trotuș	162	4,456	
