= Dăncilă =

Dăncilă may refer to:

- Dăncilă, a tributary of the river Jieț in Romania
- Viorica Dăncilă (born 1963), Romanian politician
