= Cernița (river) =

- Location within Romania

Location
- Country: Romania
- Counties: Alba County
- Villages: Ciuruleasa

Physical characteristics
- Mouth: Abrud
  - location: near Abrud
  - coordinates: 46.282°N 23.058°E
- Length: 12 km (7.5 mi)
- Basin size: 66 km^{2} (25 sq mi)

Basin features
- Progression: Abrud→ Arieș→ Mureș→ Tisza→ Danube→ Black Sea
- Tributaries
  - left: Ciuruleasa
  - right: Buninginea

The Cernița is a small river in the Apuseni Mountains, Alba County, western Romania. It is a left tributary of the river Abrud. It flows through the village Ciuruleasa, and joins the Abrud near the town Abrud. It is fed by several smaller streams, including the Buninginea and the Ciuruleasa. Its length is 12 km (7.5 mi) and its basin size is 66 km^{2} (25 sq mi).
