= Valea Buciumanilor =

- Location within Romania

Location
- Country: Romania
- Counties: Alba County
- Villages: Valea Albă, Bucium, Izbita

Physical characteristics
- Mouth: Abrud
  - location: Bucium
  - coordinates: 46.2577°N 23.1256°E
- Length: 15 km (9.3 mi)
- Basin size: 51 km^{2} (20 sq mi)

Basin features
- Progression: Abrud→ Arieș→ Mureș→ Tisza→ Danube→ Black Sea

The Valea Buciumanilor is a left tributary of the river Abrud in Romania. It flows into the Abrud in Bucium-Sat. Its length is 15 km (9.3 mi) and its basin size is 51 km^{2} (20 sq mi).
