= Wallachian Plain =

Landform in Romania and Serbia

Coordinates: 44°30′N 26°15′E

Geography of Romania
Topography

Carpathians (peaks)
Plains & Delta
Islands

Hydrography

Rivers (Danube)
Lakes
Black Sea

Climate

The Romanian Plain (Romanian: Câmpia Română) is located in southern Romania and the easternmost tip of Serbia, where it is known as the Wallachian Plain (Serbian: Влашка низија, romanized: Vlaška nizija). It is part of the larger Eurasian Steppe. It is located in the historical region of Wallachia, and bordered by the Danube River in the east, south, and west and by the Getic Plateau in the north. Bucharest, the capital of Romania, is located in the central part of the Romanian Plain. It is contiguous to the south with the Danubian Plain (Bulgarian: Дунавска равнина, romanized: Dunavska ravnina) in Bulgaria. The Romanian Plain is also sometimes referred to as the Danubian Plain (Câmpia Dunării) in the Romanian language, though this designation is not specific, because the Danube flows through a number of plains along its course, including the Hungarian Plain (which is called the Danubian Plain in Slovakia and Serbia), as well as the Bavarian Lowland, which is also sometimes called the Danubian Plain.

== Relief features ==
The lowest part of the plain (10-20 m altitude) is located on the Lower Siret meadow, where, on a slowly sinking territory, a large confluence area has formed, towards which the rivers curve in a fan shape. The maximum altitude of the Romanian Plain is 300 m, at Pitești.

The relief of this plain is characterized by wide valleys and smooth interfluves, popularly called fields, with small depressions formed by compaction and suffosion (cenotes).

Sand deposits cause the formation of dunes, as in southern Oltenia, eastern Romanian Plain (along the Ialomița and Călmățui rivers) and Tecuci Plain (at Hanu Conachi).

== Geology ==
From a tectonic point of view, the Romanian Plain is part of the Moesian Platform. The base of the platform is of Hercynian origin, and the upper sediments are of Carpathian origin. The sediments date from the Mesozoic and Pleistocene periods. In the meadows, they are very recent, dating from the Holocene. The Jurassic and Cretaceous layers contain oil deposits. The loess sediment mainly covers the tabular plains, reaching a thickness of 40 m in places. In some places, we encounter sand dunes.

== Climate ==
The climate is temperate continental. Mediterranean influences are felt in the west, while in the east the continental influence is more pronounced. The east in particular is characterized by hot summers and cold winters. The Crivăț wind blows from the northeast, sometimes reaching speeds of over 30-35 m/s; winter brings cold weather and often blizzards, while summer brings hot winds and drought. The Băltăreț is a spring wind, humid and warm, which blows from the Danube marshes.

The average annual temperature is 8-11 °C, the average for April is 18-23 °C, and for January it varies between -3 and -5 °C in the east and -1 and -3 °C in the west. The average annual precipitation is less than 500 mm in the east and 500-700 mm in the west.

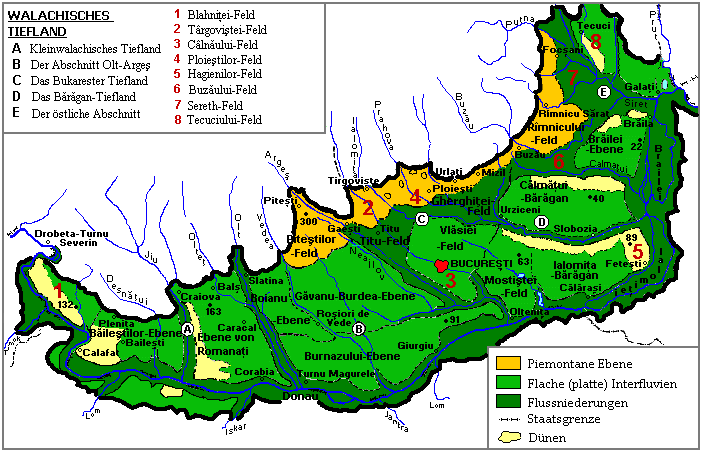
The main divisions of the Romanian Plain

== Subdivisions ==
In Romania, the plain is divided into five subdivisions and the Danube Valley, which are, from West to East:

- A. Oltenia Plain, located in southern Oltenia:
  - Blahnița Plain
  - Băilești Plain
  - Romanați Plain
- B. Olt-Argeș Plain (between the Olt River in the west and the Argeș River in the east):
  - Pitești Plain
  - Boianul Plain
  - Câmpia Găvanu-Burdea
  - Burnaz Plain
- C. București Plain:
  - Târgoviște Plain
  - Ploiești Plain
  - Mizil Plain
  - Titu Plain
  - Gherghița Plain
  - Vlăsia Plain
  - Câlnău Plain
- D. Bărăgan Plain:
  - Bărăgan of Călmățui Plain
  - Bărăgan of Ialomița Plain
  - Mostiștea Plain
  - Hagieni Plain
- E. The Eastern Plain:
  - Râmnic Plain
  - Buzău Plain
  - Brăila Plain
  - Lower Siret Plain
  - Tecuci Plain
  - Covurlui Plain
- Danube Valley:
  - The Danube valley floodplain
  - Flooded marshy islands:
    - Insula Mare a Brăilei
    - Insula Mică a Brăilei
    - Balta Ialomiței

== Rivers ==
- Neajlov
- Jiu
- Olt
- Vedea
- Argeș
- Dâmbovița
- Mostiștea
- Ialomița
- Buzău

== Gallery ==
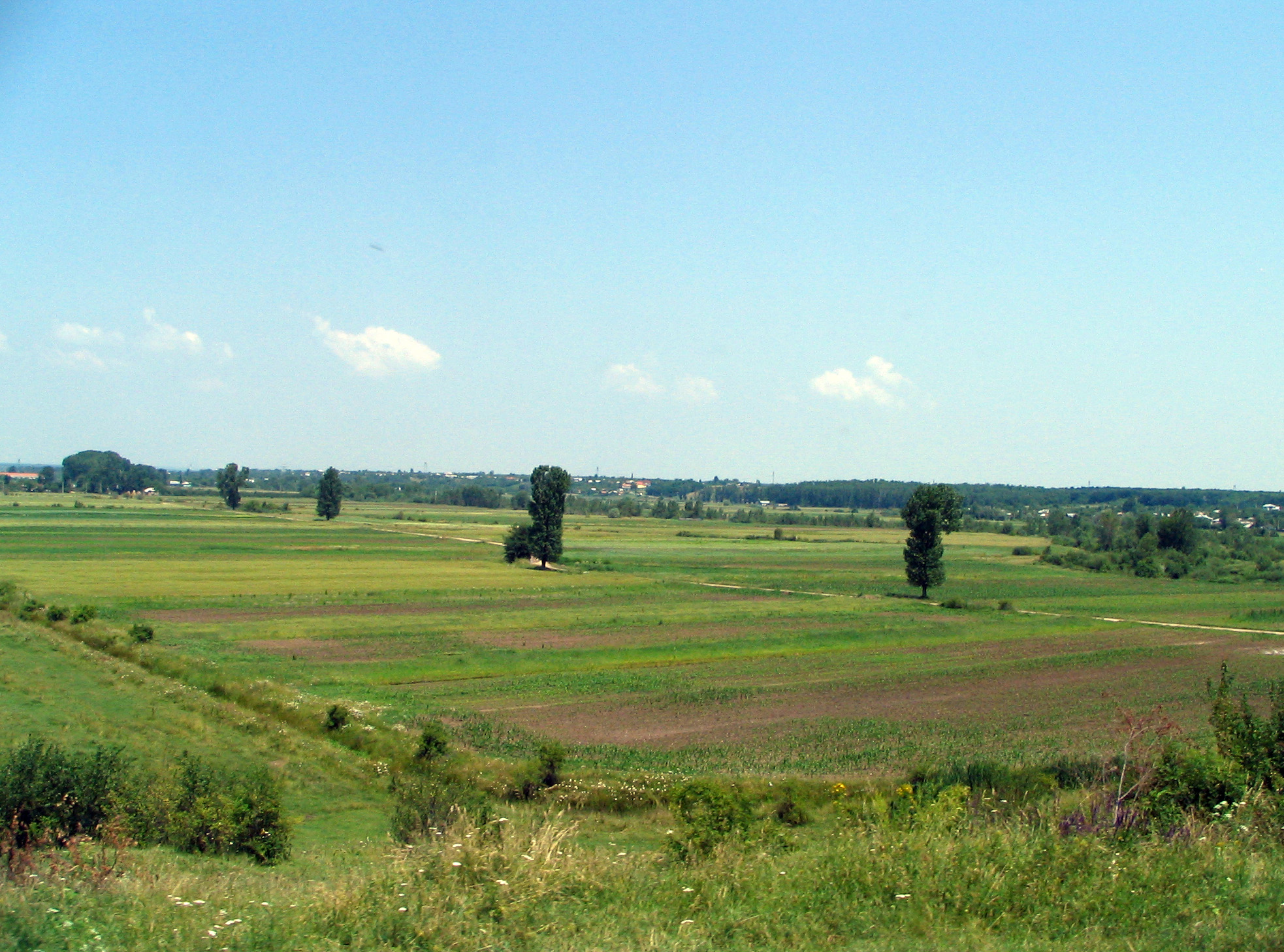
The Romanian Plain, in the southern part of Argeș County (the Pitești Plain)

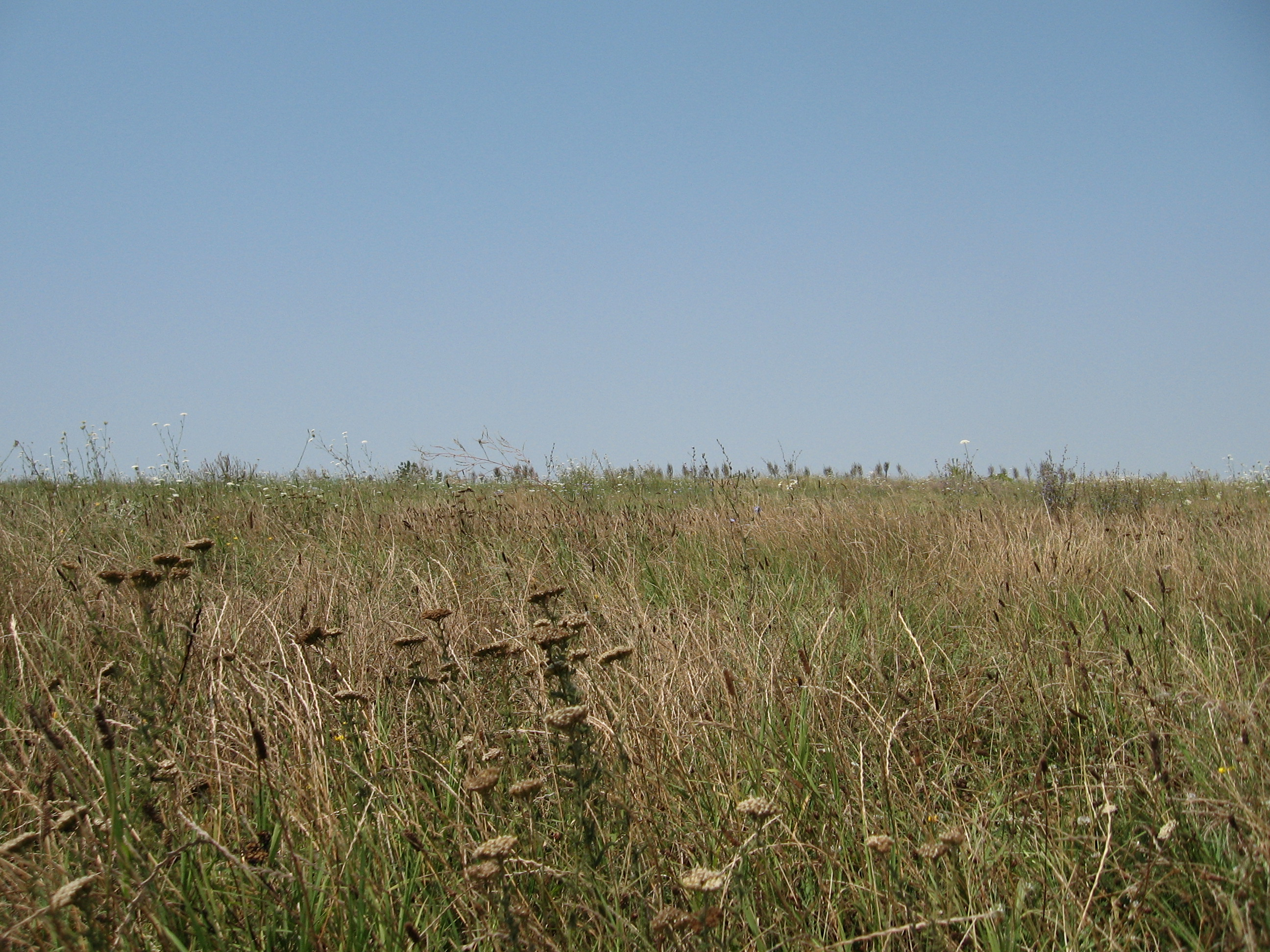
Steppe vegetation in the Burnazului Plain

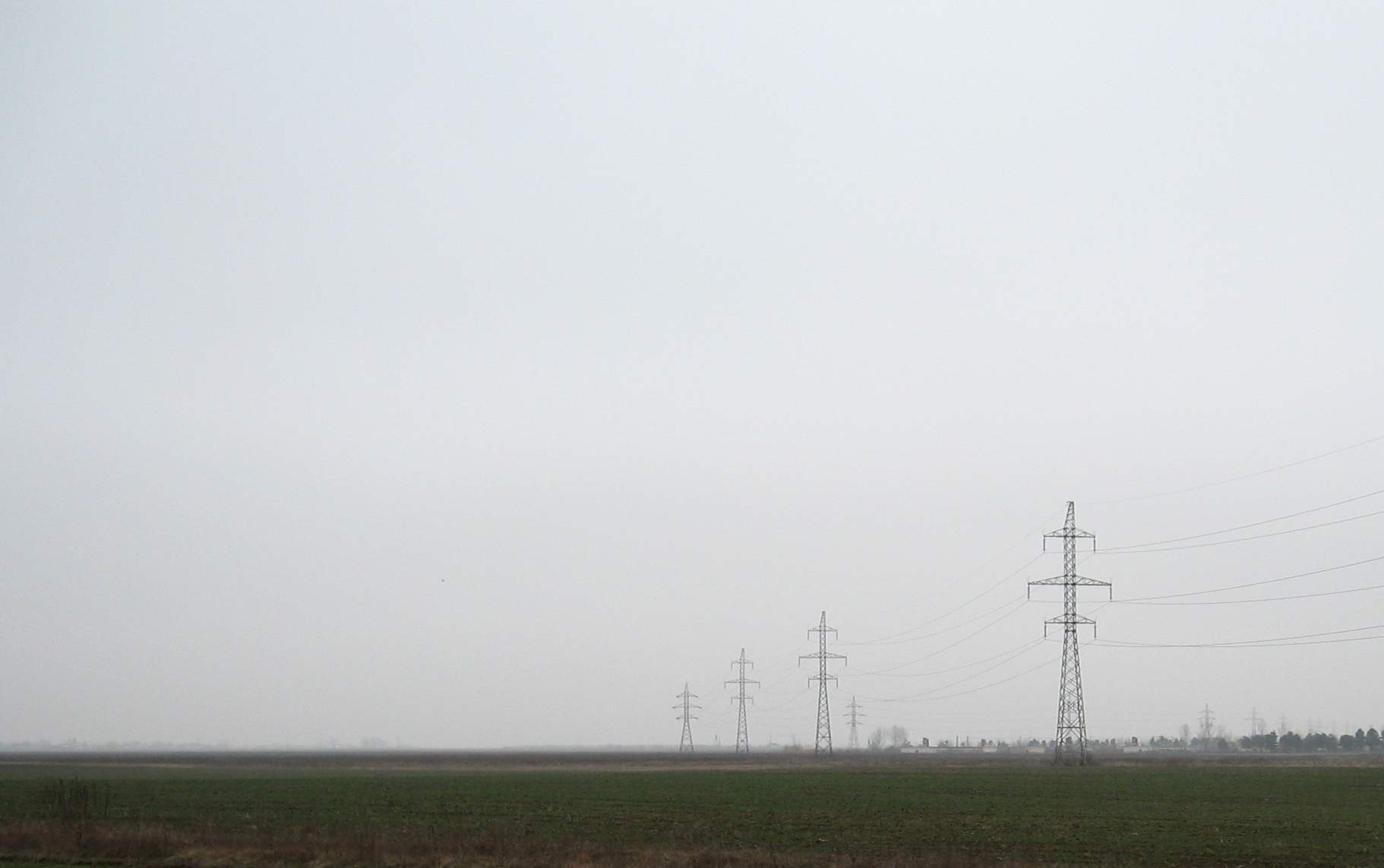
Crop land in the Titu Plain

== See also ==
- Focșani Gate
- Geography of Romania
- Danubian Plain
