= Ciuruleasa =

- Commune
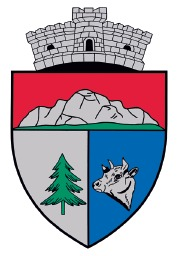
- Coat of arms

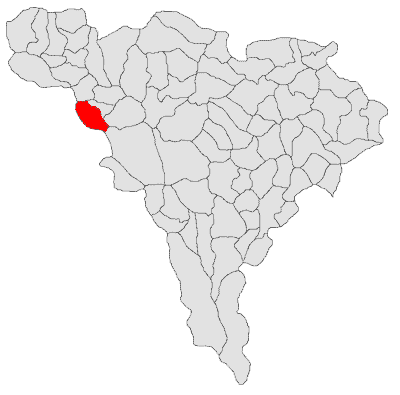
- Location in Alba County

- Location in Romania
- Coordinates: 46°15′N 23°02′E
- Country: Romania
- County: Alba

Government
  - Mayor (2021–2024): Ioan-Marius Cioara (PSD)
- Area: 55.85 km^{2} (21.56 sq mi)
- Elevation: 836 m (2,743 ft)
- Population (2021-12-01): 1,110
  - Density: 20/km^{2} (51/sq mi)
- Time zone: EET/EEST (UTC+2/+3)
- Postal code: 517250
- Area code: (+40) 02 58
- Vehicle reg.: AB
- Website: primariaciuruleasa.ro

Ciuruleasa (Hungarian: Csurulyásza) is a commune located in Alba County, Transylvania, Romania. It has a population of 1,110 as of 2021, and is composed of nine villages: Bidigești, Bodrești, Boglești, Buninginea (Buninzsina), Ciuruleasa, Ghedulești, Mătișești, Morărești, and Vulcan.

The commune is situated in the northwestern part of the county, on the border with Hunedoara County. It lies in the middle of the Apuseni Mountains, half in the Bihor Mountains and half in the Metaliferi Mountains. It borders the town of Abrud to the northeast, Bucium commune to the east, the rural part of the town of Zlatna to the southeast, Buceș commune to the southwest, Blăjeni commune to the west, and Sohodol commune to the north.

At the 2021 census, Ciuruleasa had a population of 1,110. At the census from 2011 there were 1,197 people living in this commune, of which 97.74% are ethnic Romanians.
