= Roșia Montană (river) =

- Location within Romania

Location
- Country: Romania
- Counties: Alba County
- Villages: Roșia Montană, Cărpiniș

Physical characteristics
- Mouth: Abrud
  - location: Cărpiniș
  - coordinates: 46.3102°N 23.0550°E
- Length: 8 km (5.0 mi)
- Basin size: 44 km^{2} (17 sq mi)

Basin features
- Progression: Abrud→ Arieș→ Mureș→ Tisza→ Danube→ Black Sea

The Roșia Montană is a right tributary of the river Abrud in Romania. It discharges into the Abrud in Cărpiniș. Its length is 8 km (5.0 mi) and its basin size is 44 km^{2} (17 sq mi).
