= Nămoloasa =

- Commune
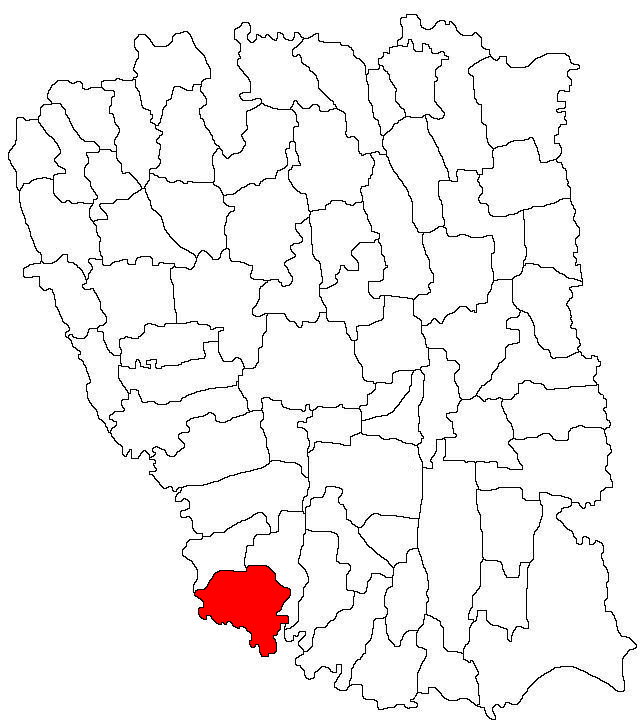
- Location in Galați County

- Location in Romania
- Coordinates: 45°32′N 27°33′E
- Country: Romania
- County: Galați

Government
  - Mayor (2020–2024): Adrian Răsmeriță (PSD)
- Area: 69.97 km^{2} (27.02 sq mi)
- Elevation: 12 m (39 ft)
- Population (2021-12-01): 1,773
  - Density: 25.34/km^{2} (65.63/sq mi)
- Time zone: UTC+02:00 (EET)
  - Summer (DST): UTC+03:00 (EEST)
- Vehicle reg.: GL
- Website: comunanamoloasa.ro

Nămoloasa is a commune in Galați County, in the Western Moldavia region of Romania. It is composed of three villages: Crângeni, Nămoloasa, and Nămoloasa-Sat.

The commune is located in the south-west of the county, on the border with Brăila County and Vrancea County, at a distance of 50 km (31 mi) from the county seat, Galați. Nămoloasa lies on the right bank of the river Siret, which separates it from the rest of Galați County; the commune can be accessed only through Vrancea County, where there is a bridge over the Siret.

Nămoloasa is geographically part of the strategic Focșani Gate. Nămoloasa was also part of the 19th century Focșani–Nămoloasa–Galați line built to guard this area more properly.
