= Bistrița Mountains =

Romanian mountain range

Coordinates: 47°07′20″N 25°40′30″E

The Bistrița Mountains (Romanian: Munții Bistriței; Hungarian: Besztercei-havasok) are mountain ranges in northern central Romania.

Geologically these ranges are considered part of the Inner Eastern Carpathians group of the Eastern Carpathians. Within Romania, however, it is traditional to divide the Eastern Carpathians in Romanian territory into three geographical groups (north, center, south), instead in Outer and Inner Eastern Carpathians. The Romanian categorization is indicated below.

The highest points of the range are:

- Budacu Peak (1859 m)
- Pietrosu Peak (1791 m)
- Bogolin Peak

== Protected Areas ==
Several protected areas are located within or adjacent to the Bistrita Mountains. The Ceahlău Massif contains protected natural landscapes and biodiversity-rich habitats that are included within Ceahlău National Park. The region supports extensive forests, alpine meadows, and a variety of plant and animal species characteristics of the Eastern Carpathians. Protected areas within the broader mountain group contribute to the conservation of habitats for species such as brown bear, gray wolf, Eurasian lynx, and numerous bird species.

== See also ==
- Romanian Carpathians
