= Abrud (river) =

River in Romania

Abrud Hungarian: Abrud-patak
- Mouth

Location
- Country: Romania
- Counties: Alba County
- Villages: Bucium, Abrud, Cărpiniș

Physical characteristics
- Mouth: Arieș
  - location: Downstream of Câmpeni
  - coordinates: 46°21′36″N 23°4′30″E
- Length: 24 km (15 mi)
- Basin size: 223 km^{2} (86 sq mi)

Basin features
- Progression: Arieș→ Mureș→ Tisza→ Danube→ Black Sea
- Tributaries
  - left: Valea Buciumanilor, Cernița
  - right: Roșia Montană

The Abrud (Hungarian: Abrud-patak) is a small river in the Apuseni Mountains, Alba County, western Romania. It is a right tributary of the river Arieș. It flows through the town Abrud, and joins the Arieș in Vârși, near Câmpeni. It is fed by several smaller streams, including Valea Buciumanilor, Valea Cerbului, Corna, Cernița and Roșia Montană. Its length is 24 km (15 mi) and its basin size is 223 km^{2} (86 sq mi).
