= Gutin Mountains =

Mountain range in eastern Europe

Coordinates: 47°41′48″N 23°50′27″E

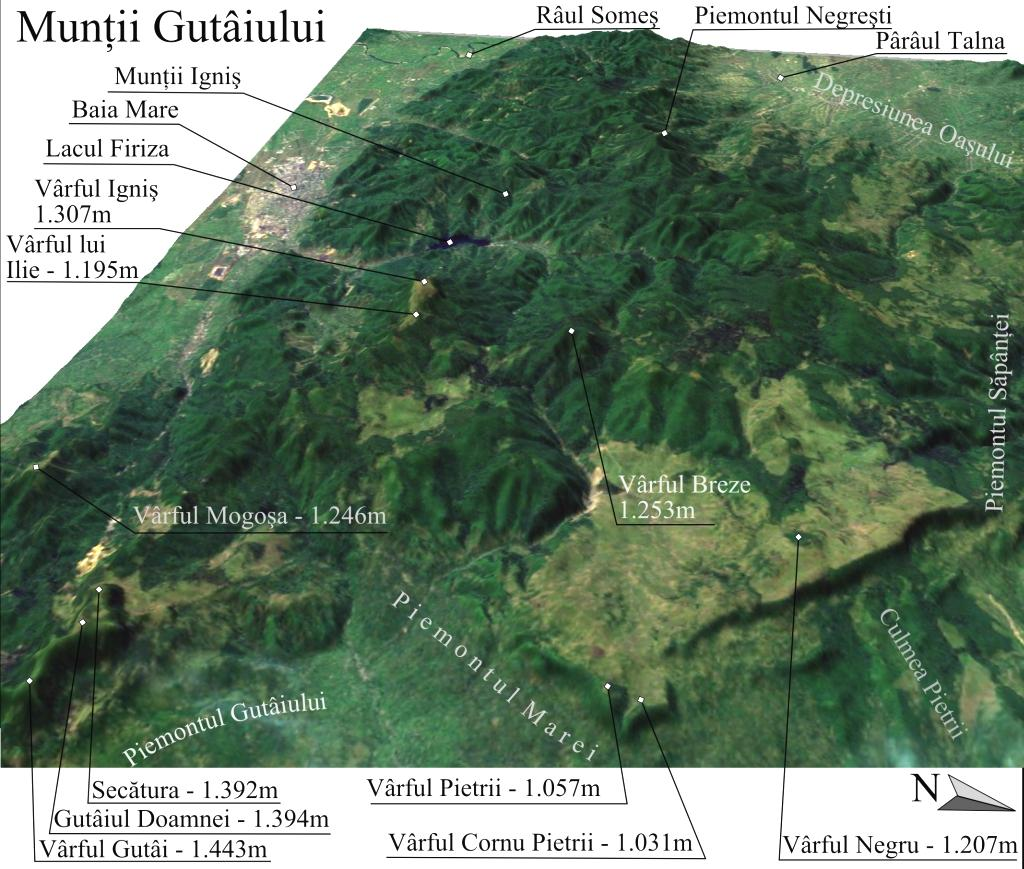
Gutin Mountains

The Gutin Mountains (Romanian: Munții Gutâi; Hungarian: Gutin-hegység; Ukrainian: Гутинський масив) are a mountain range within the Vihorlat-Gutin Area of the Inner Eastern Carpathians. They are centered in Maramureș County in Romania, bordering Satu Mare County, and also stretching further towards northwest as the Oaș Mountains, and reaching the border with Zakarpattia Oblast in Ukraine.

Its highest mountain is Gutâi Peak, with an altitude of 1,443 m (4,734 ft). The northern sections of Gutin Mountains contain the volcanic mountain chain Creasta Cocoșului (Cock's comb), peaking at 1,428 m (4,685 ft).

== See also ==
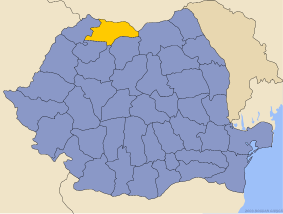
Maramureș County in Romania

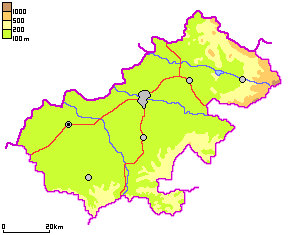
Satu Mare County in Romania, with Gutin Mountains and Oaș Mountains located on its eastern and northern borders

- Romanian Carpathians
- Ukrainian Carpathians

== Sources ==
- Földvary, Gábor Z. (1988). Geology of the Carpathian Region. Singapore: World Scientific Publishing Company. ISBN 9789813103825.
