= Focșani Gate =

Militarily and strategically important area in Romania and NATO

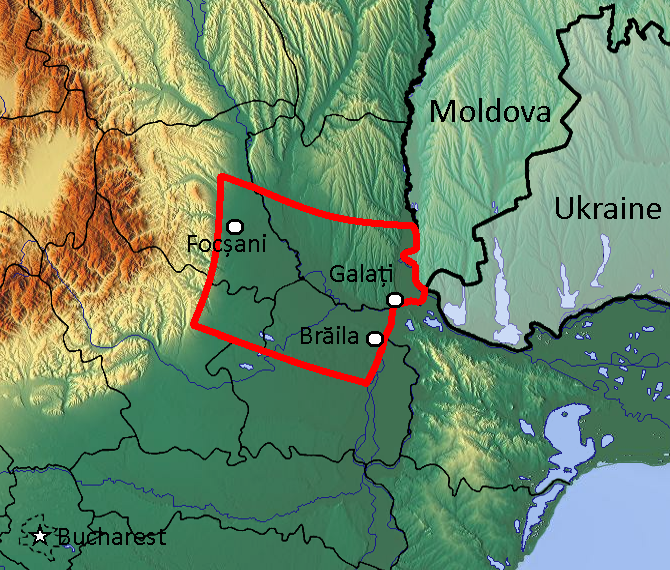
A map of the Focșani Gate

The Focșani Gate (fok-SHAN; Romanian: Poarta Focșani or Poarta Focșanilor) is a militarily and strategically vulnerable area in Romania and NATO. Located in the northeastern part of the Wallachian Plain, it spans an area of 80–85 kilometres (50–53 mi) east to west and about 60 km (37 mi) north to south on the territory of Galați, Vrancea, Buzău, and Brăila counties. Control of the Focșani Gate allows entry into vast tracts of Romanian territory and several other regions of Europe.

== History ==
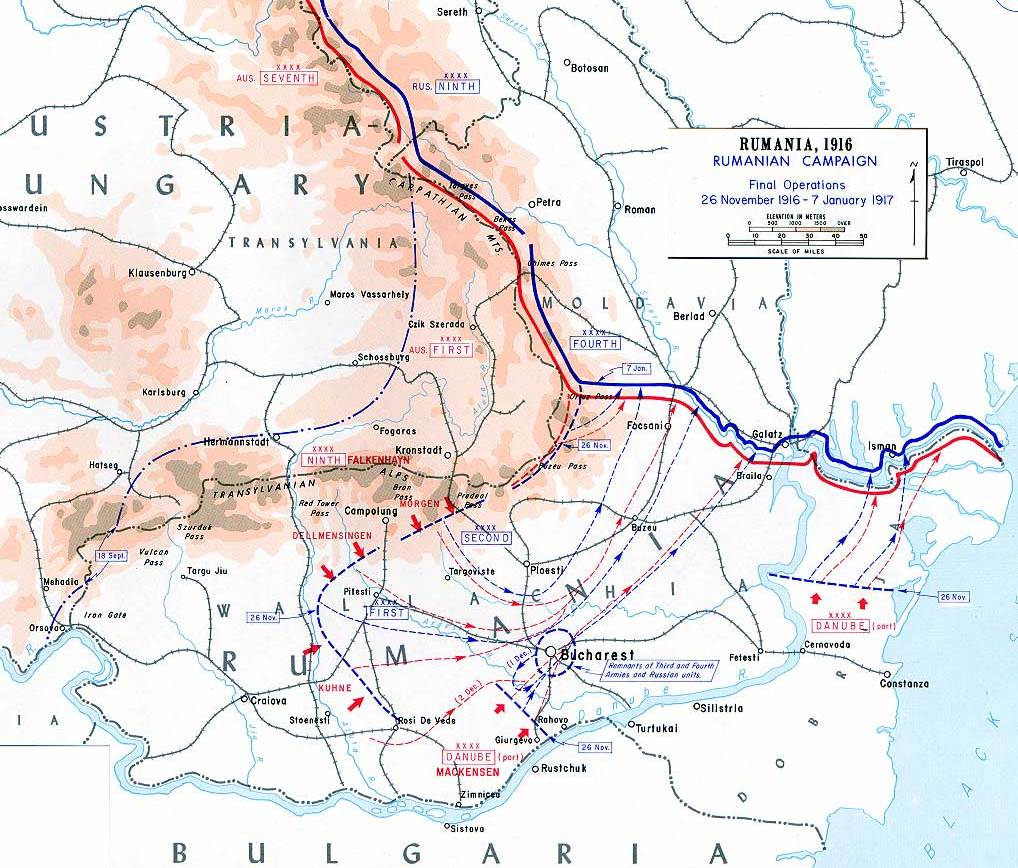
The Central Powers' advances towards the Focșani Gate, 26 November 1916–7 January 1917

The area around the city of Focșani was already recognized as a weak point in Romania back in 1882. In that year, the government of Romania carried out a study to identify all the areas of the country where the terrain was poorly suited for defense, and for engineering work to reinforce these areas. A few years before, Russia, a state then allied to Romania with which it had fought together in the Russo-Turkish War of 1877–1878, had stripped away the region of Southern Bessarabia from Romania, causing tensions between the two countries.

Concerns over Romania's defensive capabilities arose and studies were performed, starting from a plan drawn by Major Maximilian Schumann from the Prussian Army. To defend the Focșani Gate, the Focșani–Nămoloasa–Galați line was built between 1888 and 1893, using a large portion of the national military budget. The plan called for 676 artillery guns arranged in three fortified areas, Focșani, Nămoloasa, and Galați, with guns arrayed three lines deep. The artillery slated to be used represented almost half the army's artillery. 7,000 troops were to permanently man the fortifications.

The Focșani Gate saw consideration in Hypothesis Z, Romania's war plan for World War I. As defeat to the Central Powers looked increasingly likely to Romania in late 1916, the Romanian Army retreated to the Focșani Gate. Romania faced a threat from the south, and not from the north and the east, as the original plan intended. In 1917, important battles for Romania were fought in this area, including the defensive Battle of Mărășești and the offensive Battle of Mărăști. The important defensive Third Battle of Oituz was fought near the Focșani Gate.

Soviet advances through the Focșani Gate, 23–31 August 1944. Red = Soviet Red Army. Yellow = Romanian troops. Blue = Axis forces, frontlines.

The Focșani Gate played an important role in the Second Jassy–Kishinev offensive during World War II. It was heavily fortified by Nazi Germany-allied Romania during the Axis invasion of the Soviet Union (USSR). Despite this, on 27 August 1944, the Red Army passed through the Focșani Gate and occupied the cities of Izmail, Galați, and Focșani, allowing it to spread into the directions of Bucharest, the Black Sea, and the Eastern Carpathians. Romania had already withdrawn from the Axis a few days before as a result of a Royal coup d'état, subsequently being occupied by the Soviet Union and having a communist regime installed.

== Present day ==
Today, the Focșani Gate is one of the most vulnerable strategic points in NATO, of which Romania is now a member. It stands as a somewhat disconnected zone because of poor infrastructure, which makes it vulnerable to a potential attack from Russia. In early 2022, serious worries existed over whether or not Russia would invade Ukraine. Such a scenario occurred on 24 February 2022.

It has been theorised that a Russian incursion into Ukraine's region of Budjak would put Romania's Focșani Gate and the Danube Delta at risk, which could force Romania to occupy the region. A possible Romanian invasion of Budjak for security purposes has been discussed by other analysts as well.

== See also ==
- Fulda Gap
- GIUK gap
- Suwałki Gap
