= Arpaș =

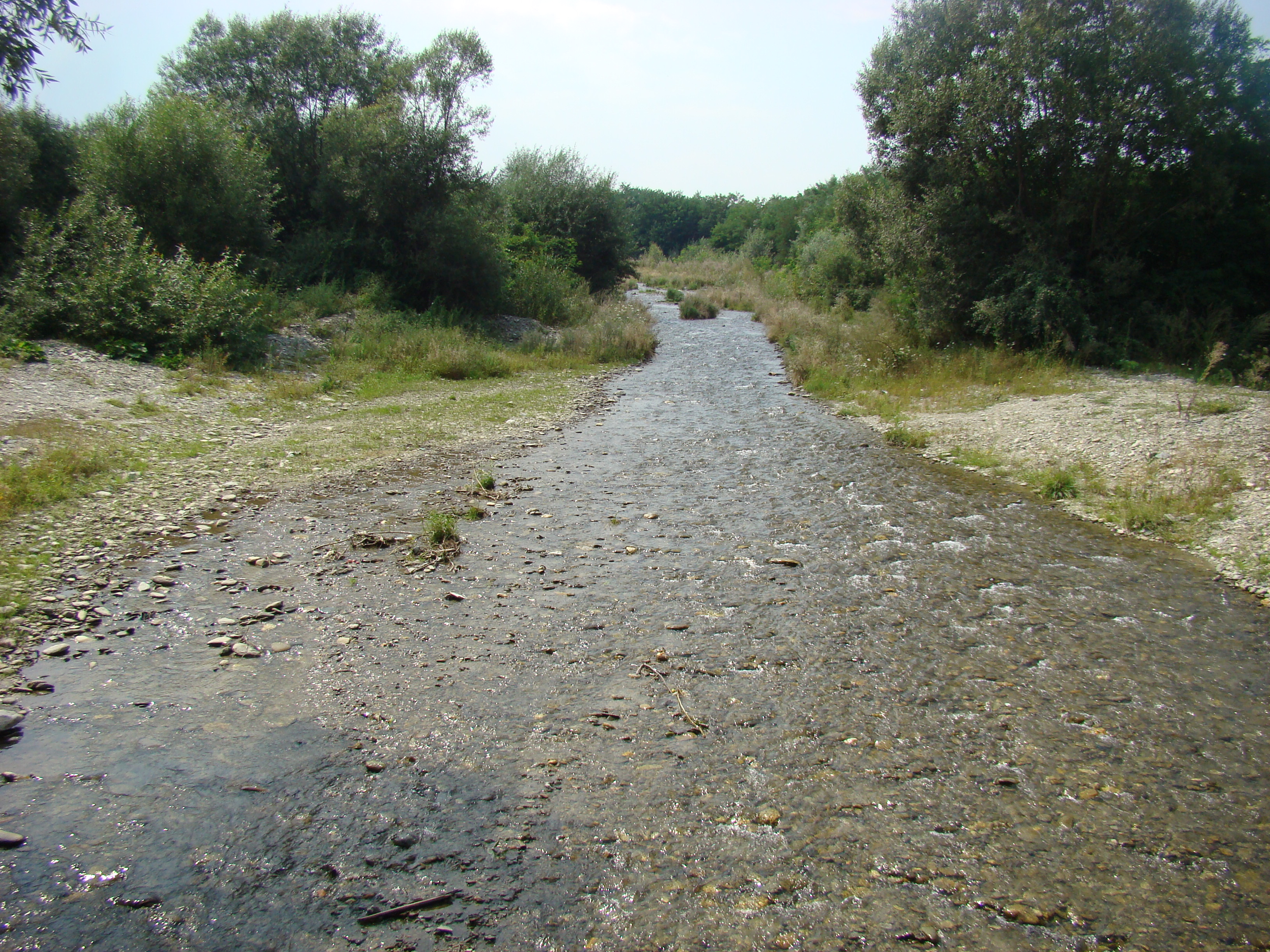
- The Arpaș near Arpașu de Sus

- Location within Romania

Location
- Country: Romania
- Counties: Sibiu County
- Villages: Arpașu de Sus, Arpașu de Jos

Physical characteristics
- Source: Făgăraș Mountains
- Mouth: Olt
  - location: Arpașu de Jos
  - coordinates: 45.7877°N 24.6193°E
- Length: 25 km (16 mi)
- Basin size: 82 km^{2} (32 sq mi)
- Discharge
  - location: Mouth
  - average: 2.13 m^{3}/s (75 cu ft/s)

Basin features
- Progression: Olt→ Danube→ Black Sea
- Tributaries
  - left: Albota, Plăvaia, Arpășel
  - right: Podragu

The Arpaș (Hungarian: Árpás-patak) is a left tributary of the river Olt in Romania. It discharges into the Olt in Arpașu de Jos. The source of the Arpaș is in the Făgăraș Mountains. Its length is 25 km (16 mi) and its basin size is 82 km^{2} (32 sq mi).

== Hydronymy ==
The Hungarian name means "barley". The Romanian name derives from that.
