= Metaliferi Mountains =

Mountains in the Carpathians

Coordinates: 46.2333°N 23.2333°E

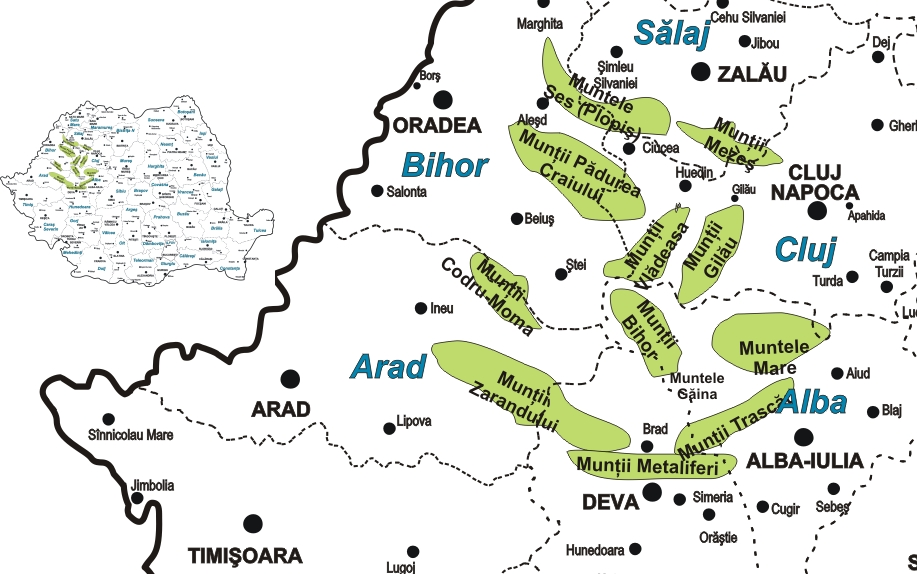
The Metaliferi Mountains within the Apuseni Mountains

Metaliferi Mountains (Romanian: Munții Metaliferi; Hungarian: Erdélyi-érchegység), meaning Ore Mountains, are in the Carpathian Mountain Range and are a division of the Apuseni Mountains.

== Peaks ==
The highest peak is Poienița Peak, with an elevation of 1,437 metres (4,715 ft). The range also includes the Detunatele, a pair of basalt peaks with columnar jointing which are two of the most beautiful peaks in the Apuseni Mountains. The Roșia Poieni copper mine and several communities are in the area.

== Lakes ==
There are several lakes nestled within the Metaliferi Mountains. Five of them are located near Roșia Montană:

- Lacul Mare has a surface area of 2.5 ha (6.2 acres) and a maximum depth of 5 m (16 ft); it is located at an altitude of 930 m (3,050 ft) and was built in 1908.
- Țarinii Lake has a surface area of 0.6 ha (1.5 acres) and a maximum depth of 10 m (33 ft); it is located at an altitude of 1,000 m (3,300 ft) and was built in 1900.
- Anghel Lake has a surface area of 0.6 ha (1.5 acres) and a maximum depth of 4 m (13 ft); it is located at an altitude of 850 m (2,790 ft), behind a 40 m (130 ft) long dam.
- Brazi Lake has a surface area of 0.6 ha (1.5 acres) and a maximum depth of 6 m (20 ft); it is located at an altitude of 930 m (3,050 ft), behind a 130 m (430 ft) long dam.
- Cartuș Lake has a surface area of 0.3 ha (0.74 acres) and a maximum depth of 2 m (6 ft 7 in).

== See also ==
- Divisions of the Carpathians
- List of lakes of Romania
