= Jieț (Jiu) =

- Location within Romania

Location
- Country: Romania
- Counties: Hunedoara County
- Villages: Jieț, Petrila

Physical characteristics
- Source: Parâng Mountains
- Mouth: Jiul de Est
  - location: Petrila
  - coordinates: 45.4515°N 23.3994°E
- Length: 27 km (17 mi)
- Basin size: 80 km^{2} (31 sq mi)

Basin features
- Progression: Jiul de Est→ Jiu→ Danube→ Black Sea

The Jieț is a left tributary of the river Jiul de Est in Romania. It discharges into the Jiul de Est in Petrila. Its source is in the Parâng Mountains. Its length is 27 km (17 mi) and its basin size is 80 km^{2} (31 sq mi).

== Tributaries ==
The following rivers are tributaries to the river Jieț (source to mouth):

- Left: Slivei, Burtan, Dăncilă, Țiganu, Mija Mică, Mija Mare, Voislava
- Right: Ghereș, Coasta lui Rus, Groapa Seacă, Fometescu
