= Banat Mountains =

Mountain ranges in Romania

Coordinates: 45°00′N 21°55′E

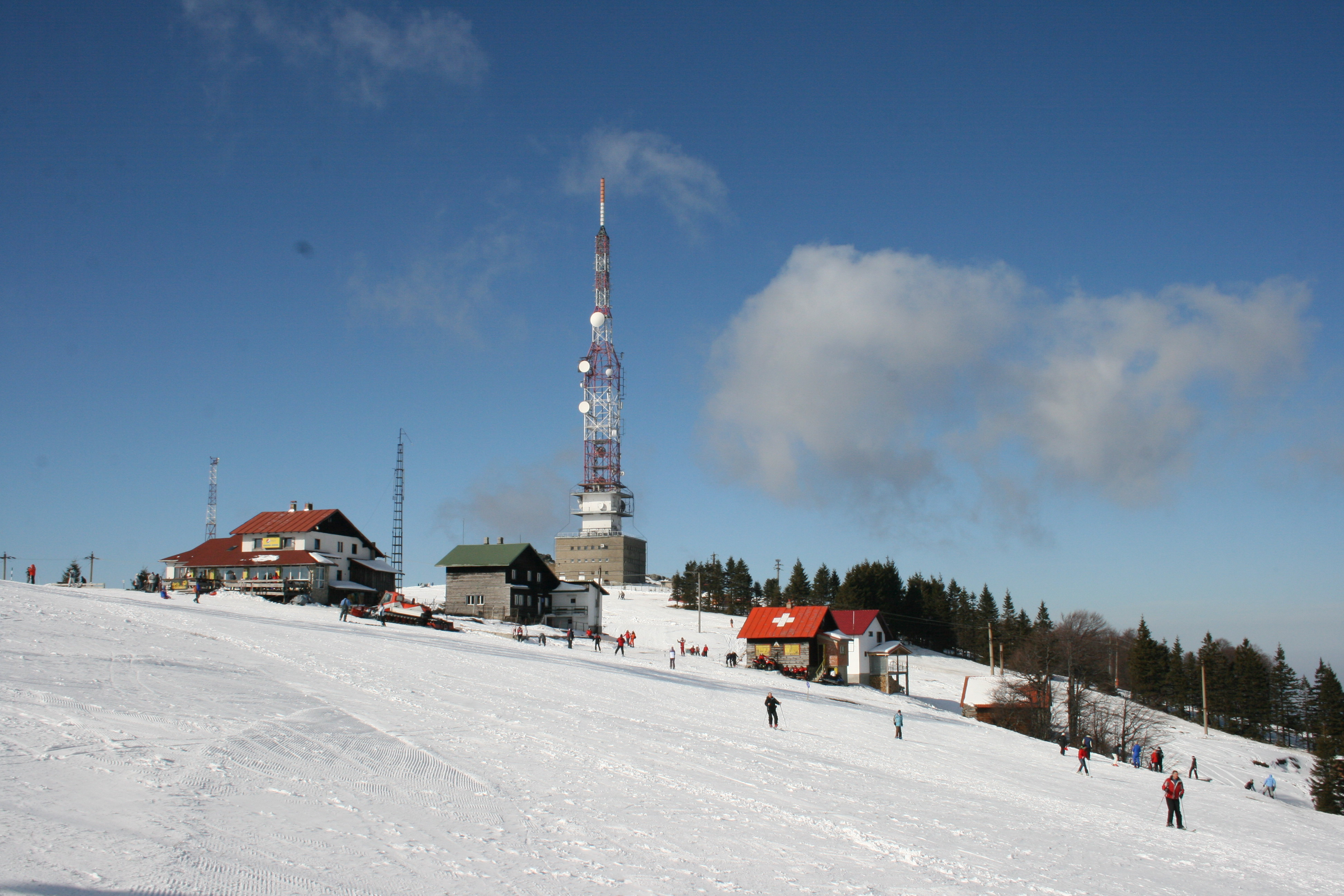
Semenic National Park and Ski Resort, within the Banat Mountains

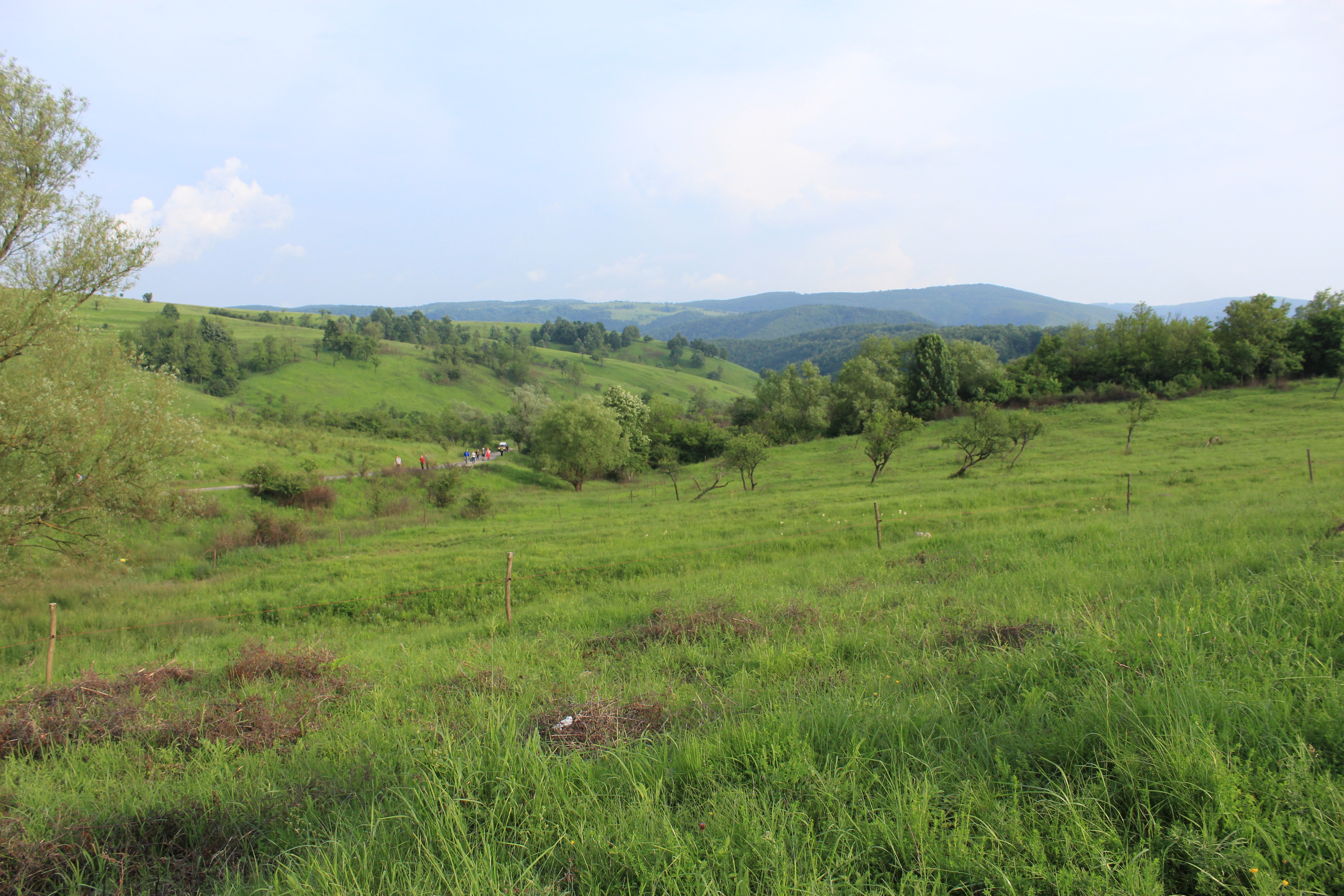
View of the Banat Mountains

The Banat Mountains (Romanian: Munții Banatului; Hungarian: Bánsági-hegyvidék) are a number of mountain ranges in Romania, considered part of the Western Romanian Carpathians (Carpații Occidentali Românești) mountain range.

The Banat Mountains consist of :

- The Banat Mountains (Munții Banatului) per se, which include:
  - the Semenic Mountains (Munții Semenic);
  - the Locva Mountains (Munții Locvei);
  - the Anina Mountains (Munții Aninei);
  - and the Dognecea Mountains (Munții Dognecei).
- The Almăj Mountains (Munții Almăjului).
- The Timiș-Cerna Gap (Culoarul Timiș-Cerna), including the Almăj Depression (Depresiunea Almăj), which divide the Banat Mountains from the Southern Carpathians.
- The Caraș Hills (Dealurile Carașului).

== Hydrography ==
The river system consists of the following rivers:

- Mureș
- Nera
- Caraș
- Bârzava
- Timiș
- Bega
