= Geography of Romania =

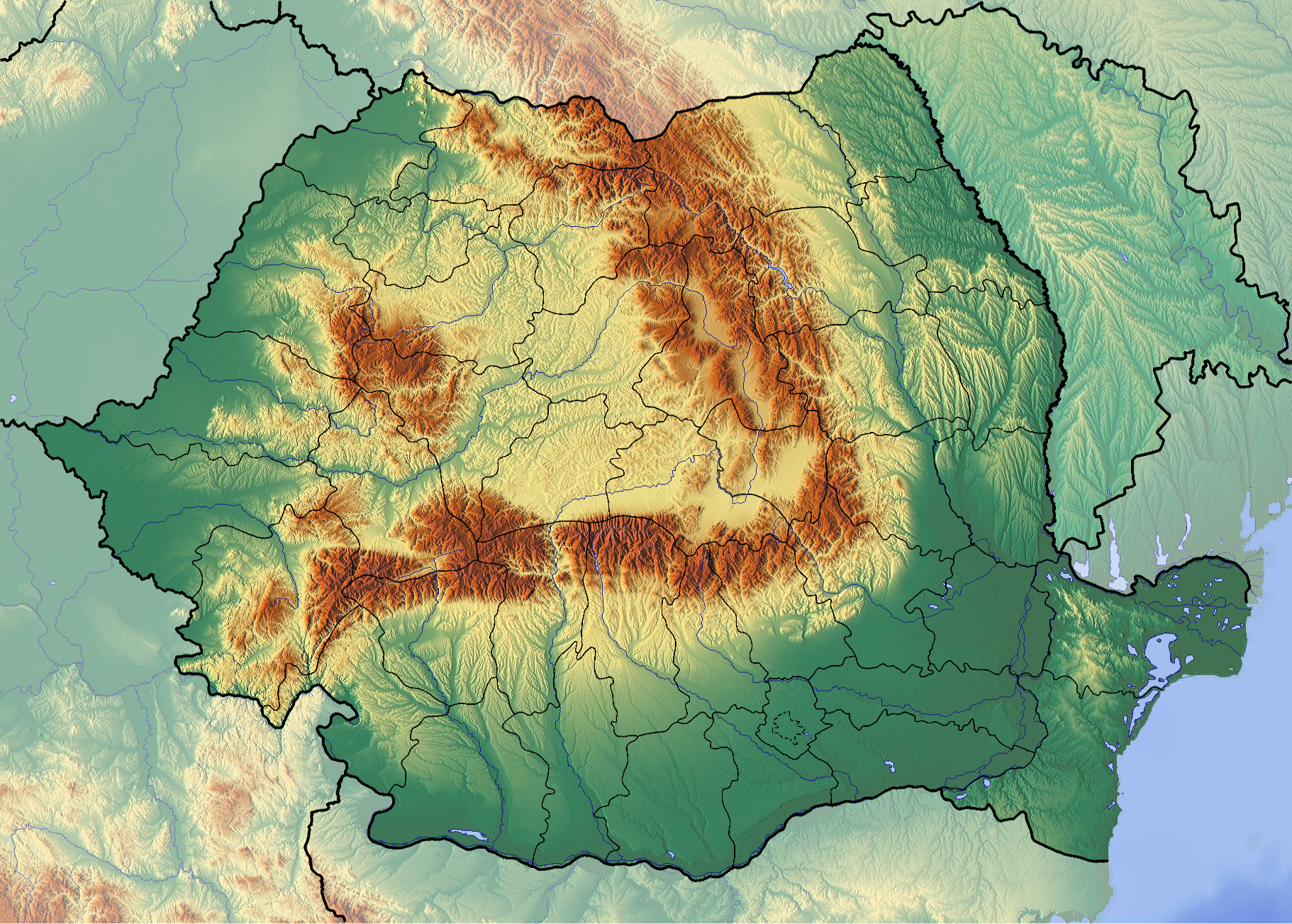
- Continent: Europe
- Region: Central Europe and Eastern Europe
- Coordinates: 46°00′N 25°00′E
- Area: Ranked 81st
  - Total: 238,397 km^{2} (92,046 sq mi)
  - Land: 97.03%
  - Water: 2.97%
- Coastline: 245 km (152 mi)
- Borders: 3,149.9 km (1,985 mi)
- Highest point: Moldoveanu Peak 2,544 metres (8,346 ft), Negoiu Peak 2,535 metres (8,317 ft)
- Lowest point: Black Sea 0 metres (0 ft)
- Longest river: Olt River 615 kilometres (382 mi)
- Largest lake: Lake Razelm 511 km^{2} (197.30 sq mi)
- Exclusive economic zone: 23,627 km^{2} (9,122 mi^{2})

With an area of 238,397 km^{2} (92,046 mi^{2}), Romania is the twelfth-largest country in Europe. It is a country located at the crossroads of Eastern and Southeast Europe. Bordering the Black Sea, Romania has 3,195 kilometres (1,985 mi) of borders. Moldova and Ukraine lie to the east, Bulgaria to the south, and Serbia and Hungary lie to the west via the Pannonian Plain. In the southeast, 245 kilometres (152 mi) of sea coastline provide an important outlet to the Black Sea and the Atlantic Ocean.

== History ==
Traditionally Romania is divided into several historic regions that no longer perform any administrative function:

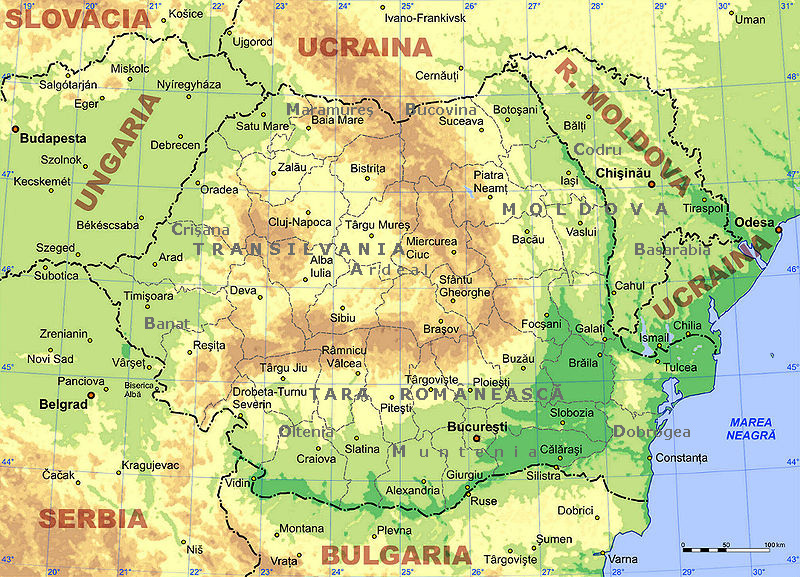
Physical and administrative map of Romania, with the historic regions in grey (Țara Românească means Wallachia).

Dobruja is the easternmost region, extending from the northward course of the Danube to the shores of the Black Sea.

Moldavia stretches from the Eastern Carpathians to the Prut River on the Moldovan and Ukrainian border.

Wallachia reaches south from the Transylvanian Alps to the Bulgarian border and is divided by the Olt River into Oltenia on the west and Muntenia on the east. The Danube forms a natural border between Muntenia and Dobruja.

The west-central region, known as Transylvania, is delimited by the arc of the Carpathians, which separates it from the Maramureș region in the northwest; by the Crișana area, which borders Hungary in the west; and by the Banat region of the southwest, which adjoins both Hungary and Serbia. It is these areas west of the Carpathians that contain the highest concentrations of the nation's largest ethnic minorities—Hungarians, Germans, and Serbs.

Romania's exterior boundaries are a result of relatively recent events. At the outbreak of World War I, the country's territory included only the provinces of Walachia, Moldavia, and Dobruja. This area, known as the Regat or the Old Kingdom, came into being with the disintegration of the Ottoman Empire in the mid-nineteenth century. At the end of World War I, Romania acquired Transylvania and the Banat. Some of this territory was lost during World War II, but negotiations returned it to Romania. Although this acquisition united some 85 percent of the Romanian-speaking population of Eastern Europe into one nation, it left a considerable number of ethnic Hungarians under Romanian rule. Disputes between Hungary and Romania regarding this territory would surface regularly, as both considered the region part of their national heritage. Questions were also periodically raised as to the historical validity of the Soviet-Romanian border. Bukovina and Bessarabia, former Romanian provinces where significant percentages of the population are Romanian-speaking, were part of the Soviet Union from the end of World War II to its dissolution, and subsequently part of the (formerly Soviet) states of Ukraine and Moldova. Despite ongoing and potential disputes, however, since 1989 Romania has no territorial claims to make.

Romania's current administrative divisions include 41 counties and one city, Bucharest, with special status; see Administrative divisions of Romania.

== Topography ==
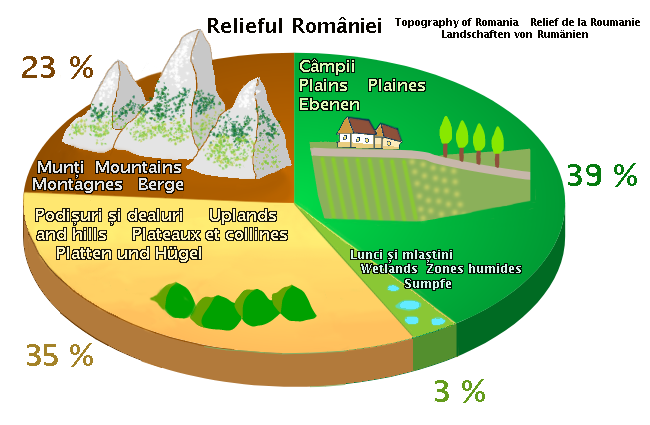
Natural landscape of Romania

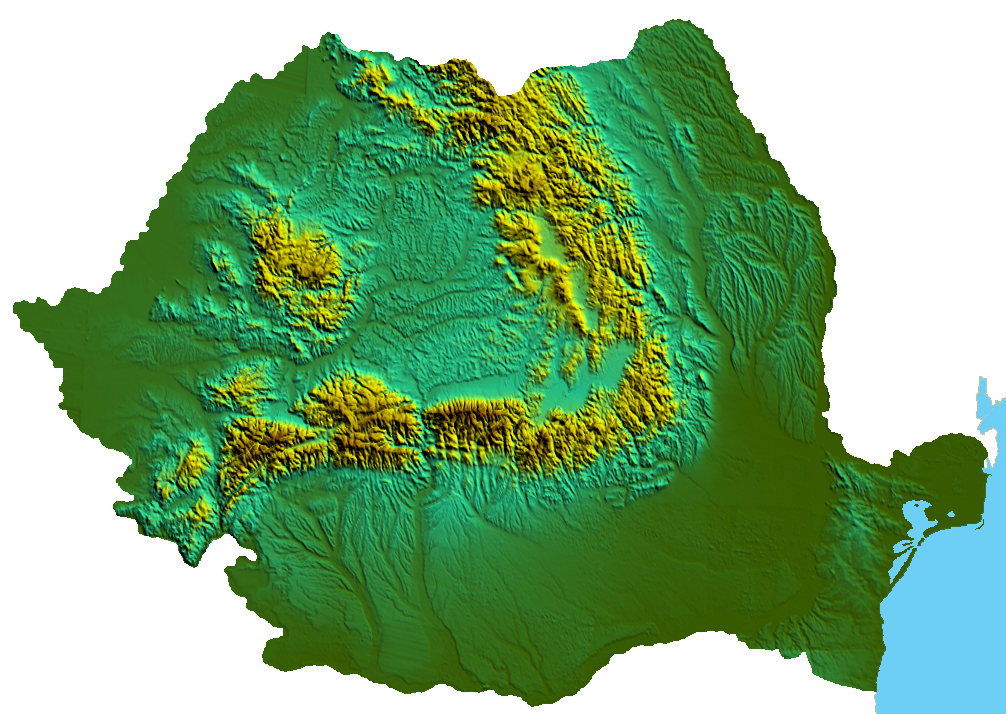
Physical map of Romania showing the Carpathian Mountains

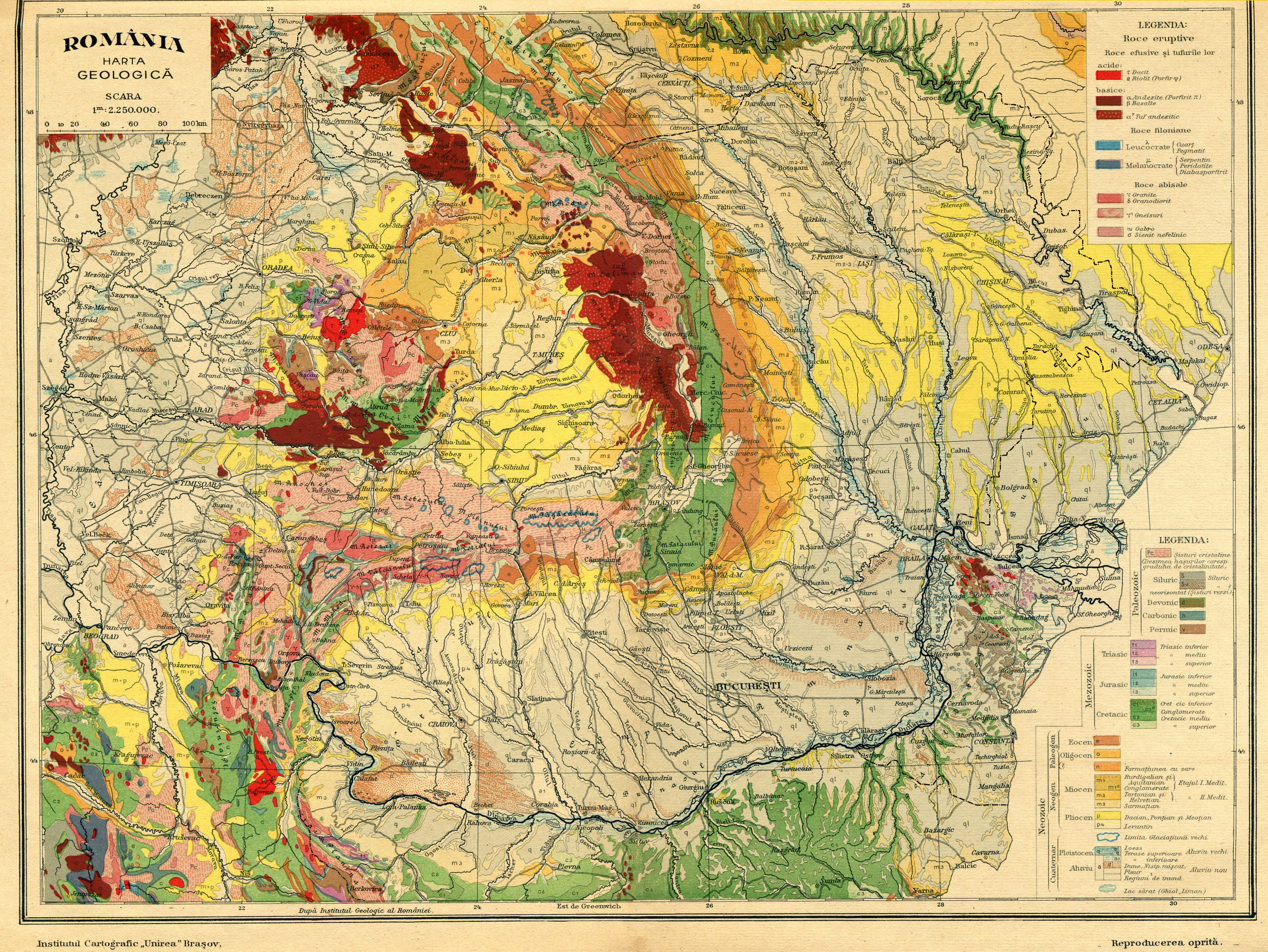
Geology of Romania and neighbours

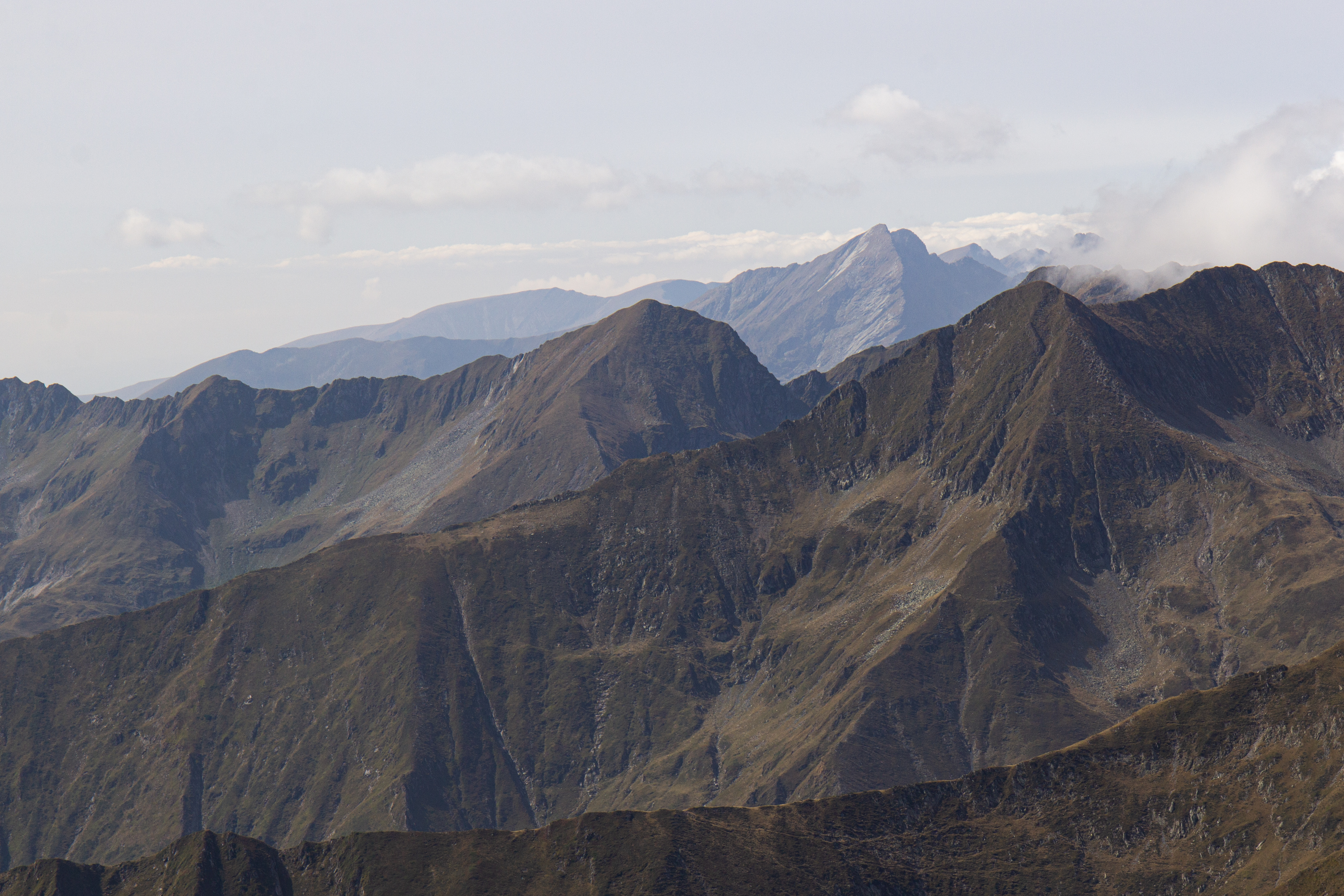
The Făgăraș Mountains are the tallest in Romania

Romania's natural landscape is almost evenly divided among mountains (23 percent), plains (39 percent), and hills (35 percent). These varied relief forms spread rather symmetrically from the Carpathian Mountains, which reach elevations of more than 2,500 meters, to the Danube Delta, which is just a few meters above sea level.

The arc of the Carpathians extends over 1,000 kilometers through the center of the country, covering an area of 71,000 square kilometers. These mountains are of low to medium altitude and are no wider than 100 kilometers. They are deeply fragmented by longitudinal and transverse valleys and crossed by several major rivers. These features and the fact that there are many summit passes—some at altitudes up to 2,256 meters—have made the Carpathians less of a barrier to movement than other European ranges. Another distinguishing feature is the many eroded platforms that provide tableland at relatively high altitudes. There are permanent settlements here at above 1,200 meters.

Romania's Carpathians are differentiated into three ranges: the Eastern Carpathians, the Southern Carpathians or Transylvanian Alps, and the Western Romanian Carpathians. Each of these ranges has important distinguishing features. The Eastern Carpathians are composed of three parallel ridges that run from northwest to southeast. The westernmost ridge is an extinct volcanic range with many preserved cones and craters. The range has many large depressions, in the largest of which the city of Brașov is situated. Important mining and industrial centers as well as agricultural areas are found within these depressions. The Eastern Carpathians are covered with forests—some 32 percent of the country's woodlands are there. They also contain important ore deposits, including gold and silver, and their mineral water springs feed numerous health resorts.

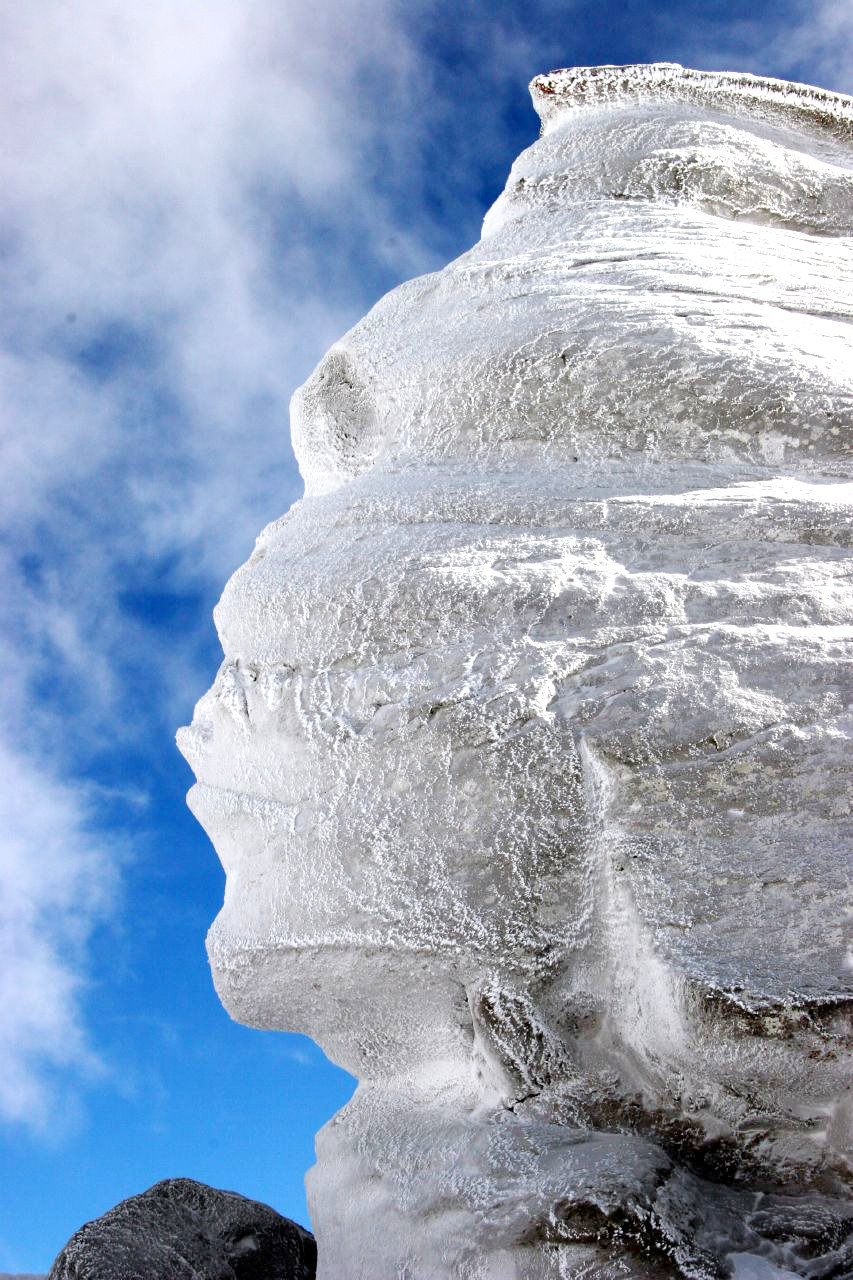
Romanian Sphinx situated on the plateau of Bucegi Mountains at 2,216 m. altitude, measures 8 meters in height and 12 meters in width

The Southern Carpathians offer the highest peaks at Moldoveanu Peak (2,544 m) and Negoiu (2,535 m) and more than 150 glacial lakes. They have large grassland areas and some woodlands but few large depressions and subsoil resources. At higher elevations, the wind and rain have turned the rocks into spectacular figures such as the Sphinx and Babele.

The region was crisscrossed by an ancient network of trans-Carpathian roads, and vestiges of the old Roman Way are still visible. Numerous passes and the valleys of the Olt, Jiu, and Danube rivers provide routes for roads and railways through the mountains.

The Western Romanian Carpathians are the lowest of the three ranges and are fragmented by many deep structural depressions. They have historically functioned as "gates," which allow easy passage but can be readily defended. The most famous of these is the Iron Gate on the Danube. The Western Romanian Carpathians are the most densely settled, and it is in the northernmost area of this range, the Apuseni Mountains, that permanent settlements can be found at the highest altitudes.

Enclosed within the great arc of the Carpathians lie the undulating plains and low hills of the Transylvanian Plateau—the largest tableland in the country and the center of Romania. This important agricultural region also contains large deposits of methane gas and salt. To the south and east of the Carpathians, the Sub-Carpathians form a fringe of rolling terrain ranging from 396 to 1,006 meters in elevation. This terrain is matched in the west by the slightly lower Western Hills. The symmetry of Romania's relief continues with the Getic Tableland to the south of the Sub-Carpathians, the Moldavian Tableland in the east between the Sub-Carpathians and the Prut River, and the Dobrujan Tableland in the southeast between the Danube and the Black Sea. The Sub-Carpathians and the tableland areas provide good conditions for human settlement and are important areas for fruit growing, viticulture, and other agricultural activity. They also contain large deposits of brown coal and natural gas.

Beyond the Carpathian foothills and tablelands, the plains spread south and west. In the southern parts of the country, the lower Danube Plain is divided by the Olt River; east of the river lies the Wallachian Plain (including the strategically important Focșani Gate), and to the west is the Oltenian or Western Plain. The land here is rich with chernozemic soils and forms Romania's most important farming region. Irrigation is widely used, and marshlands in the Danube's floodplain have been diked and drained to provide additional tillable land.

Romania's lowest land is found on the northern edge of the Dobruja region in the Danube Delta. The delta is a triangular swampy area of marshes, floating reed islands, and sandbanks, where the Danube ends its trek of almost 3,000 kilometers and divides into three frayed branches before emptying into the Black Sea. The Danube Delta provides a large part of the country's fish production, and its reeds are used to manufacture cellulose. The region also serves as a nature preserve for rare species of plant and animal life including migratory birds.

== Hydrography ==
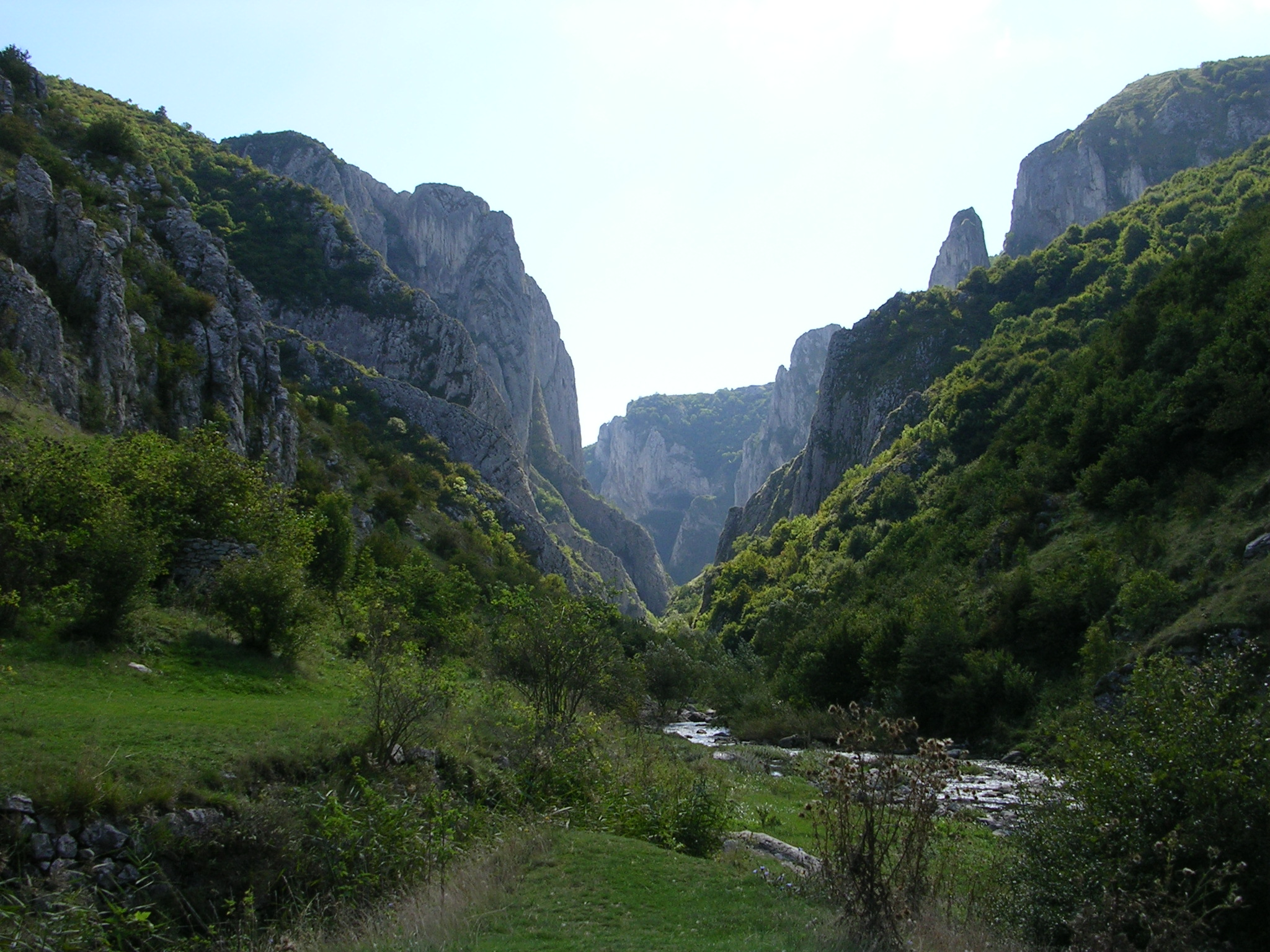
Cheile Turzii and Hășdate River in Transylvania.

=== Rivers ===
After entering the country in the southwest at Bazias, the Danube travels some 1,075 kilometers (almost 40% of its entire length) through or along Romanian territory, forming the southern frontier with Serbia and Bulgaria. Virtually all of the country's rivers are tributaries of the Danube, either directly or indirectly, and by the time the Danube's course ends in the Black Sea, they account for nearly 40 percent of the total discharge. The most important of these rivers are the Mureș River, the Olt River, the Prut, the Siret River, the Ialomița River, the Someș River, and the Argeș River. The Olt River 615 kilometres (382 mi) is the longest river that is fully within Romania's national borders.

Romania's rivers primarily flow east, west, and south from the central crown of the Carpathians. They are fed by rainfall and melting snow, which causes considerable fluctuation in discharge and occasionally catastrophic flooding. In the east, river waters are collected by the Siret and the Prut. In the south, the rivers flow directly into the Danube, and in the west, waters are collected by the Tisza on Hungarian territory.

The Danube is by far Romania's most important river, not only for transportation, but also for the production of hydroelectric power. One of Europe's largest hydroelectric stations is located at the Iron Gates, where the Danube surges through the Carpathian gorges. The Danube is an important water route for domestic shipping, as well as international trade. It is navigable for river vessels along its entire Romanian course and for seagoing ships as far as the port of Brăila. A problem with the use of the Danube for inland transportation is its remoteness from most of the major industrial centers. Moreover, marshy banks and perennial flooding impede navigation in some areas.

=== Lakes ===
There are over 3,500 lakes in Romania. Lake Razelm is the largest, with an area of 511 km^{2} (197.30 sq mi).

== Climate ==
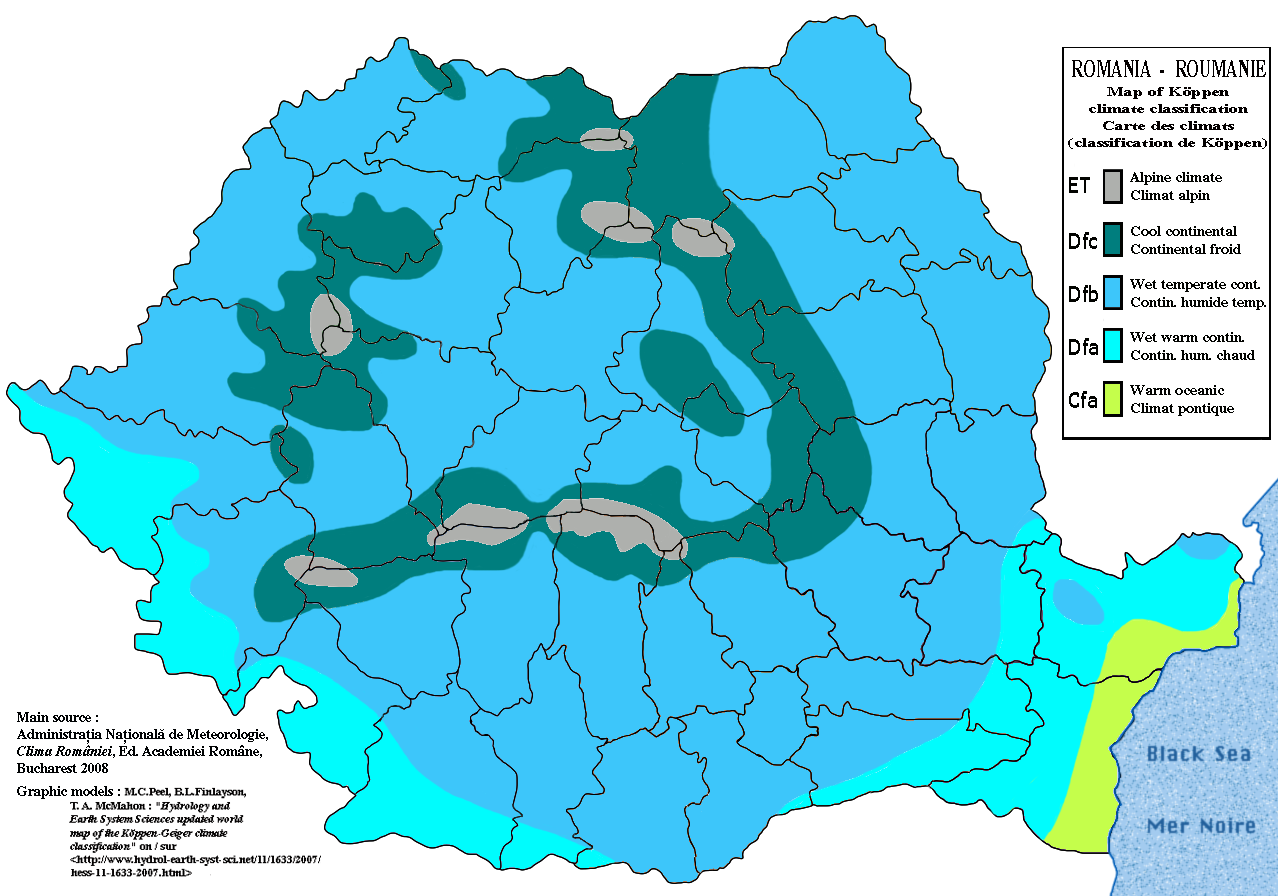
Romania map of Köppen climate classification, according with Clima României from the Administrația Națională de Meteorologie, Bucharest 2008

Because of its position on the southeastern portion of the European continent, Romania has a climate that is generally continental. Climatic conditions are somewhat modified by the country's varied relief. The Carpathians serve as a barrier to Atlantic air masses, restricting their oceanic influences to the west and center of the country, where they make for milder winters and heavier rainfall. The mountains also block the continental influences of the vast plain to the north in Ukraine, which bring frosty winters and less rain to the south and southeast. In the extreme southeast, Mediterranean influences offer a milder, maritime climate. The average annual temperature is 11 °C (51.8 °F) in the south and 8 °C (46.4 °F) in the north. In Bucharest, the temperature ranges from −29 °C (−20.2 °F) in January to 29 °C (84.2 °F) in July, with average temperatures of −3 °C (26.6 °F) in January and 23 °C (73.4 °F) in July. Rainfall, although adequate throughout the country, decreases from west to east and from mountains to plains. Some mountainous areas receive more than 1,010 mm (39.8 in) of precipitation each year. Annual precipitation averages about 635 mm (25 in) in central Transylvania, 521 mm (20.5 in) at Iași in Moldavia, and only 381 mm (15 in) at Constanța on the Black Sea.

Temperate; cold, cloudy winters with frequent snow and fog; sunny summers with frequent showers and thunderstorms. Winters generally are from November to March. The springs are short, occasionally turning right into summer. Summer lasts from May to August. They have a prolonged autumn, from September to November. The average January temperature is 34 °F (1.1 °C) and the average July temperature is 69 °F (20.6 °C). Facts: Record High Temperature: 44.5 °C (112.1 °F) - August 10, 1951 South-Eastern Romania; Record Low Temperature: −38.5 °C (−37.3 °F) - January 24, 1942 (Central Romania)

== Location ==
Southeastern Europe, bordering the Black Sea and Danube, with the Carpathian mountains in its center. Controls most easily traversable land route between the Balkans, Moldova and Ukraine

Geographic coordinates: 46°00′N 25°00′E

Extreme points of Romania:

- Northernmost point: Horodiștea, a village in Botoșani County, on the border with Ukraine, 48°15′N 26°42′E
- Southernmost point: Zimnicea, a town in Teleorman County, on the border with Bulgaria, 43°37′N 25°23′E
- Westernmost point: Beba Veche, a village in Timiș County, on the border with Hungary and Serbia, 46°07′N 20°15′E
- Easternmost point: Sulina, a town in Tulcea County, on the Danube Delta, 45°09′N 29°41′E

== Area ==
Total: 239,391 square kilometres (92,429 sq mi)

- Land: 231,231 square kilometres (89,279 sq mi)
- Water: 7,160 square kilometres (2,760 sq mi)

== Land boundaries ==
- Total: 3,149.9 km (1,957.3 mi)
  - border countries: Bulgaria 631 km (392 mi), Hungary 448 km (278 mi), Moldova 681 km (423 mi), Serbia 546 km (339 mi), and Ukraine to the north and east for 649 km (403 mi).

== Coastline ==
- Length: 245 kilometres (152 mi)
- Maritime claims: Snake Island
- contiguous zone: 24 nmi (44.4 km; 27.6 mi)
- continental shelf: 200 m depth or to the depth of exploitation
- exclusive economic zone: 23,627 km^{2} (9,122 mi^{2}) with 200 nmi (370.4 km; 230.2 mi)
- territorial sea: 12 nmi (22.2 km; 13.8 mi)

== Terrain ==
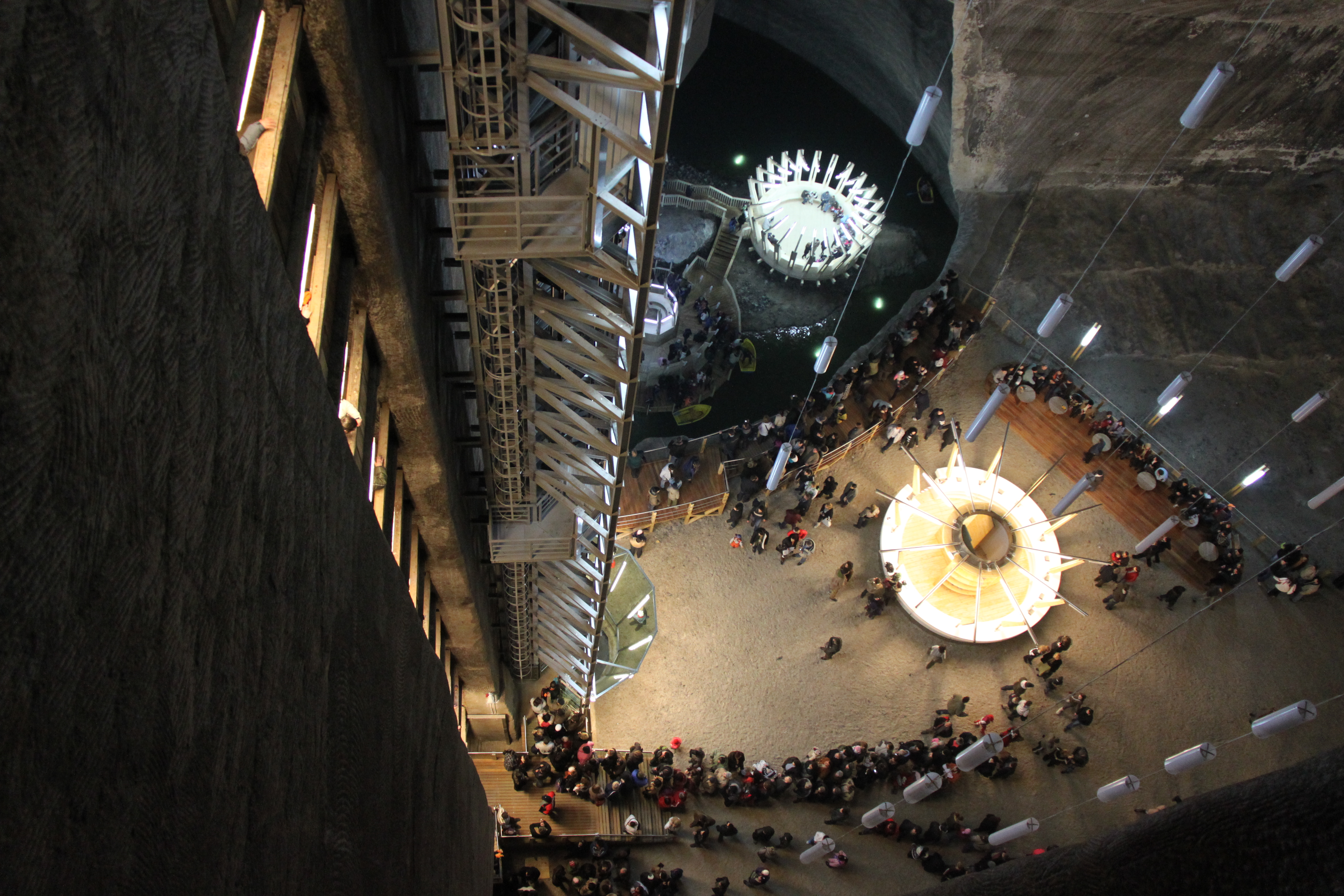
Turda salt mine

Central Transylvanian Basin is separated from the Plain of Moldavia on the east by the Carpathian Mountains and separated from the Wallachian Plain on the south by the Transylvanian Alps.

Elevation extremes:

- lowest point: Black Sea 0 m
- highest point: Moldoveanu Peak 2,544 m, Negoiu Peak 2,535 m

Natural resources

- petroleum (reserves steady to declining), timber, natural gas, coal, iron ore, salt, arable land, hydro power

Land use:

- arable land: 41%
- permanent crops: 3%
- permanent pastures: 21%
- forests and woodland: 29%
- other: 6% (1993 est.)

Irrigated land:

- 31,020 km^{2} (1993 est.)

Natural hazards: earthquakes are most severe in south and southwest; geologic structure and climate promote landslides

== Environment ==
- Current issues: soil erosion and degradation; water pollution; air pollution in south from industrial effluents; contamination of Danube delta wetlands
- Environment: international agreements:
  - party to: Air Pollution, Antarctic Treaty, Biodiversity, Climate Change, Desertification, Endangered Species, Environmental Modification, Hazardous Wastes, Law of the Sea, Nuclear Test Ban, Ozone Layer Protection, Ship Pollution, Wetlands
  - signed, but not ratified: Air Pollution-Persistent Organic Pollutants, Antarctic-Environmental Protocol, Climate Change-Kyoto Protocol

== See also ==
- Administrative divisions of Romania
- List of cities in Romania
- Reservoirs and dams in Romania
- List of mountain peaks in Romania
- List of fish of the Black Sea
