= Vânătarea lui Buteanu =

Mountain peak

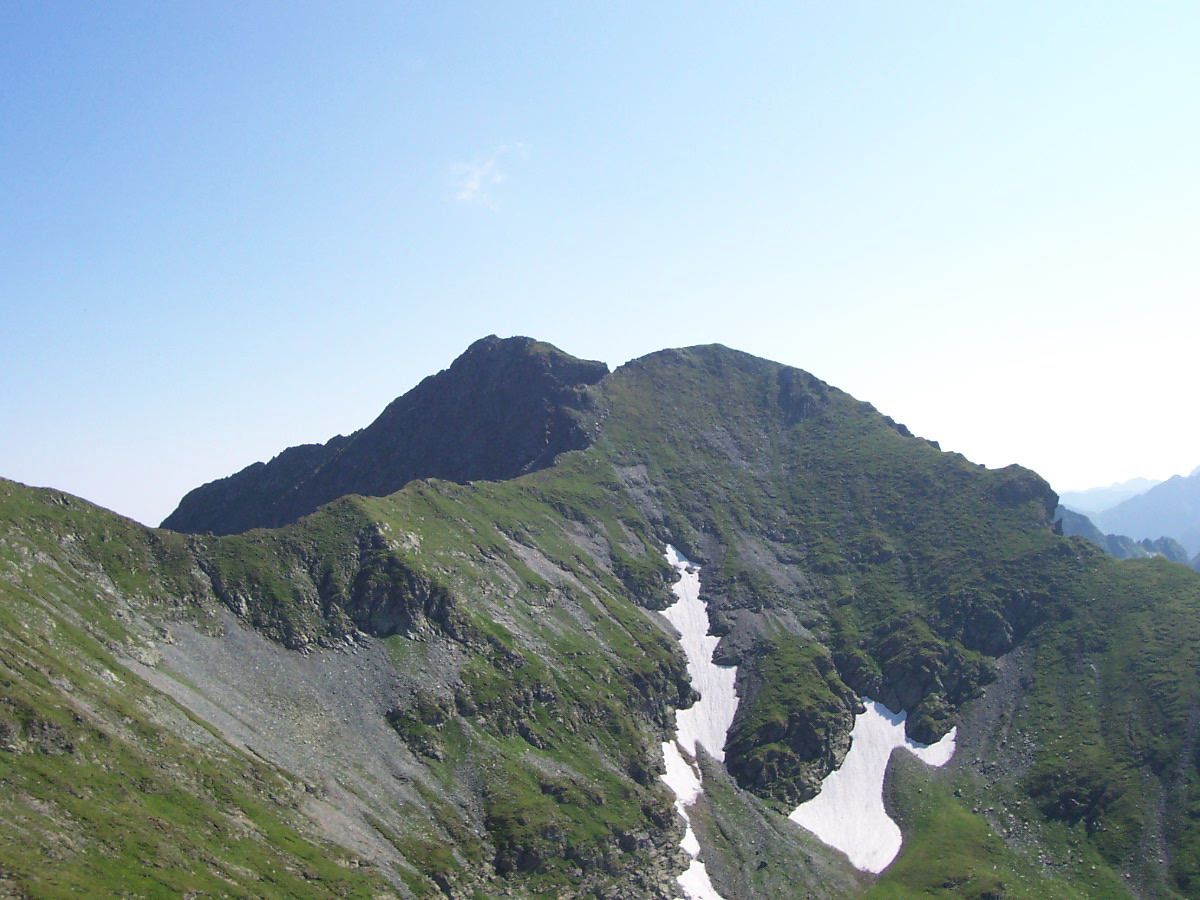
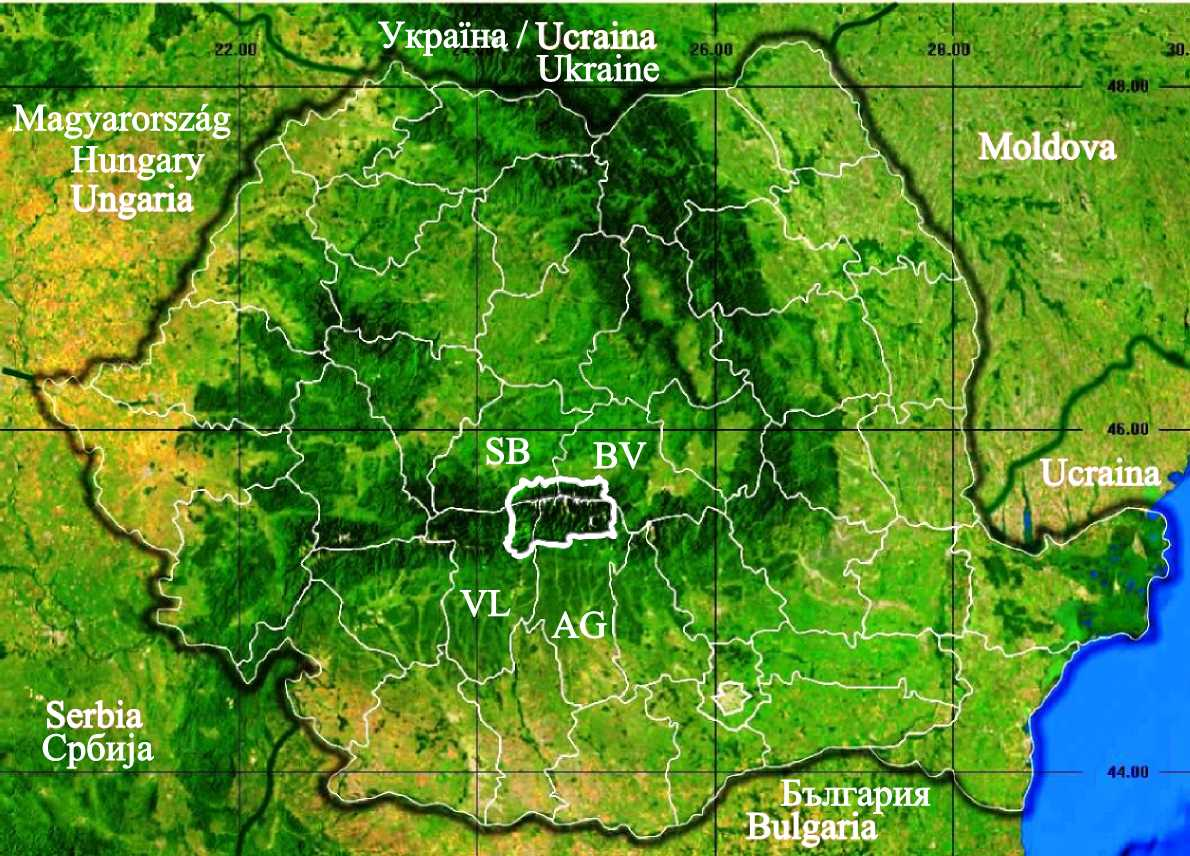
- Făgăraş Mountains on the map of Romania

Highest point
- Elevation: 2,507 m (8,225 ft)
- Prominence: 375 m (1,230 ft)
- Coordinates: 45°36′15″N 24°34′52″E

Geography
- Location within Făgăraș Mountains
- Location: Sibiu County, Romania
- Parent range: Făgăraș Mountains, Southern Carpathians

Climbing
- Easiest route: Scramble

Vânătarea lui Buteanu (Romanian: [vɨnəˈtare̯a luj buˈte̯anu]), at 2,507 metres (8,225 ft), is the eighth-highest peak in Romania and the fifth-highest peak from Făgăraș Mountains, after Moldoveanu (2,544 metres (8,346 ft)), Negoiu (2,535 metres (8,317 ft)), Viștea Mare (2,527 metres (8,291 ft)) and Lespezi (2,522 metres (8,274 ft)). It is one of the easiest mountains to climb in Romania that is more than 2500 metres tall. It can be reached in 2 hours from the Bâlea lake which is accessible by car in the summer and cable car in the winter.

== Image gallery ==
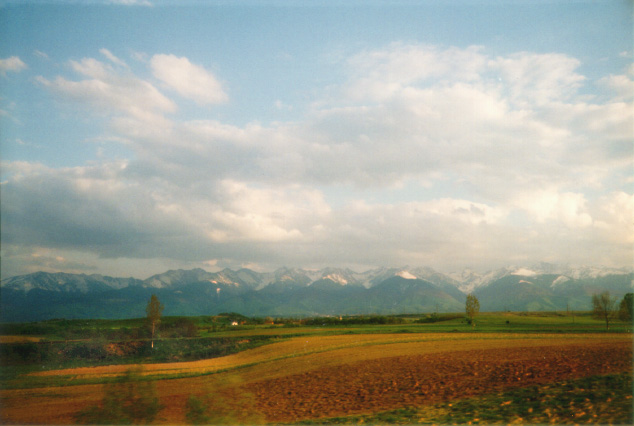
Făgăraș mountain range

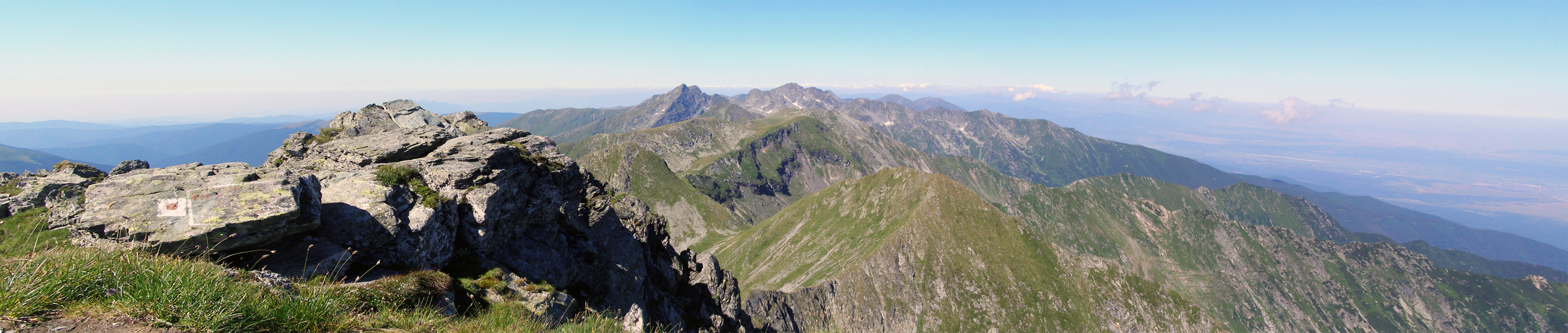
From the peak

== See also ==
List of mountains in Romania
