= Transfăgărășan =

Mountain pass in Romania

Coordinates: 45.5981°N 24.6165°E

National Road 7C
- Drumul Național 7C
- Transfăgărășan
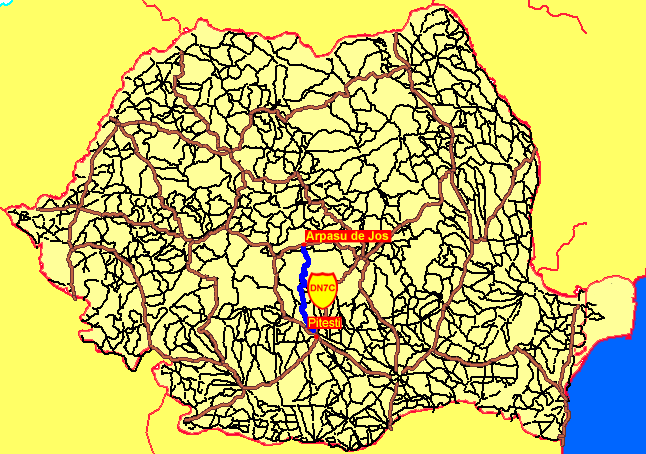

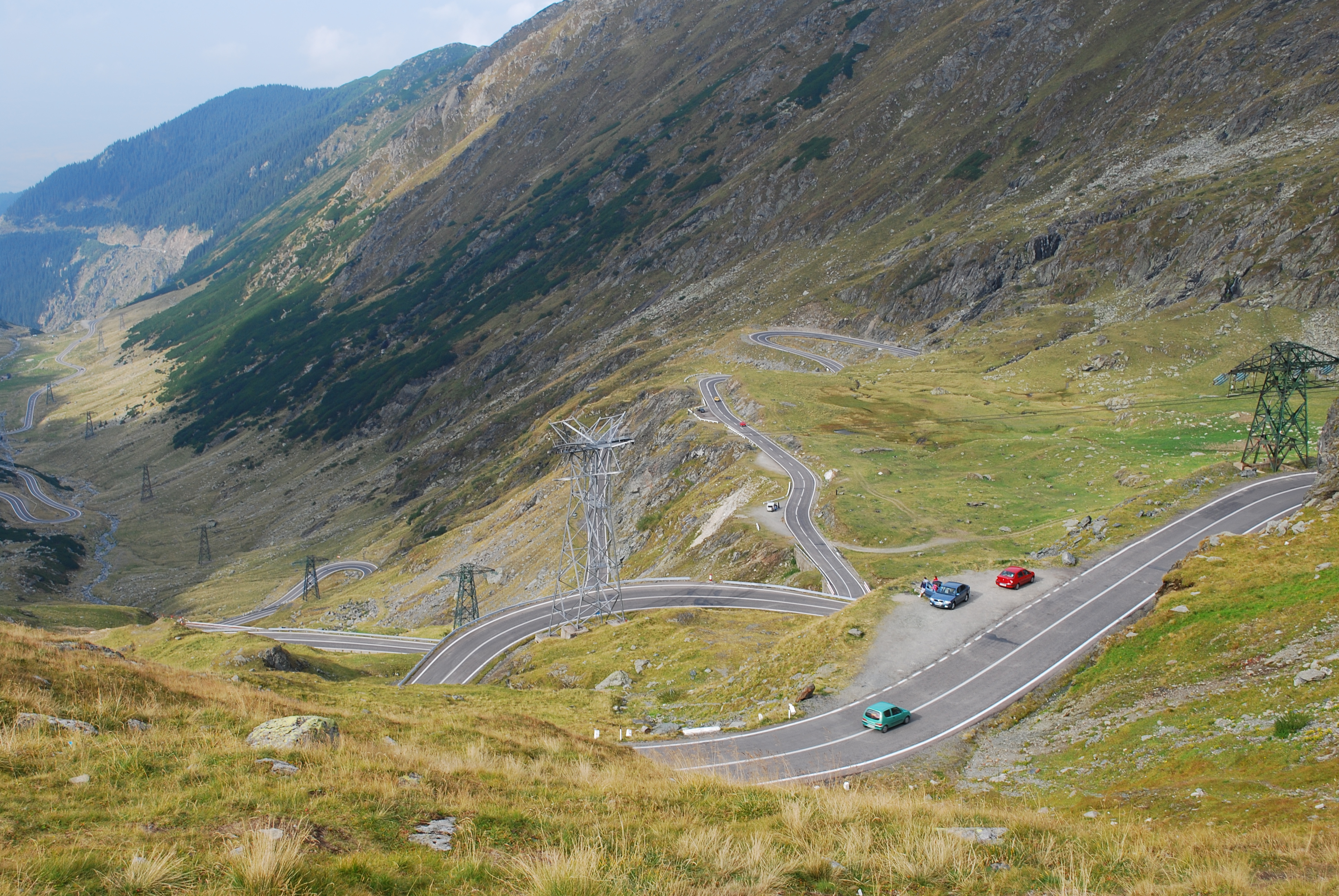

Route information
- Maintained by Compania Națională de Autostrăzi și Drumuri Naționale din România
- Length: 151 km (94 mi)
- Existed: 1974–present

Major junctions
- From: Pitești
- To: Arpașu de Jos

Location
- Country: Romania
- Major cities: Căpățâneni, Bâlea Lake, Arpașu de Jos, Arefu, Pitești, Curtea de Argeș

Highway system
- Roads in Romania; Highways

The Transfăgărășan (trans + Făgăraș), or DN7C, is a paved mountain road crossing the southern section of the Carpathian Mountains of Romania. It has national-road ranking and is the second-highest paved road in the country after the Transalpina. It starts near the village of Bascov, near Pitești, and stretches 90 kilometres (56 mi) to the crossroad between the DN1 and Sibiu, between the highest peaks in the country, Moldoveanu and Negoiu. The road, built in the early 1970s as a strategic military route, connects the historic regions of Transylvania and Wallachia.

== History ==
The Transfăgărășan was constructed between 1970 and 1974 during the rule of Nicolae Ceaușescu as a response to the 1968 invasion of Czechoslovakia by the Soviet Union. Ceaușescu wanted to ensure quick military access across the mountains in case of a Soviet invasion. At the time, Romania already had several strategic mountain passes through the Southern Carpathians, whether inherited from the pre-communist era (the DN1 and the high-pass DN67C) or built during the initial years of the Communist regime (the DN66). These passes, however, were mainly through river valleys, and would be easy for the Soviets to block and attack. Ceaușescu therefore ordered the construction of a road across the Făgăraș Mountains, which divide northwestern and southern Romania.

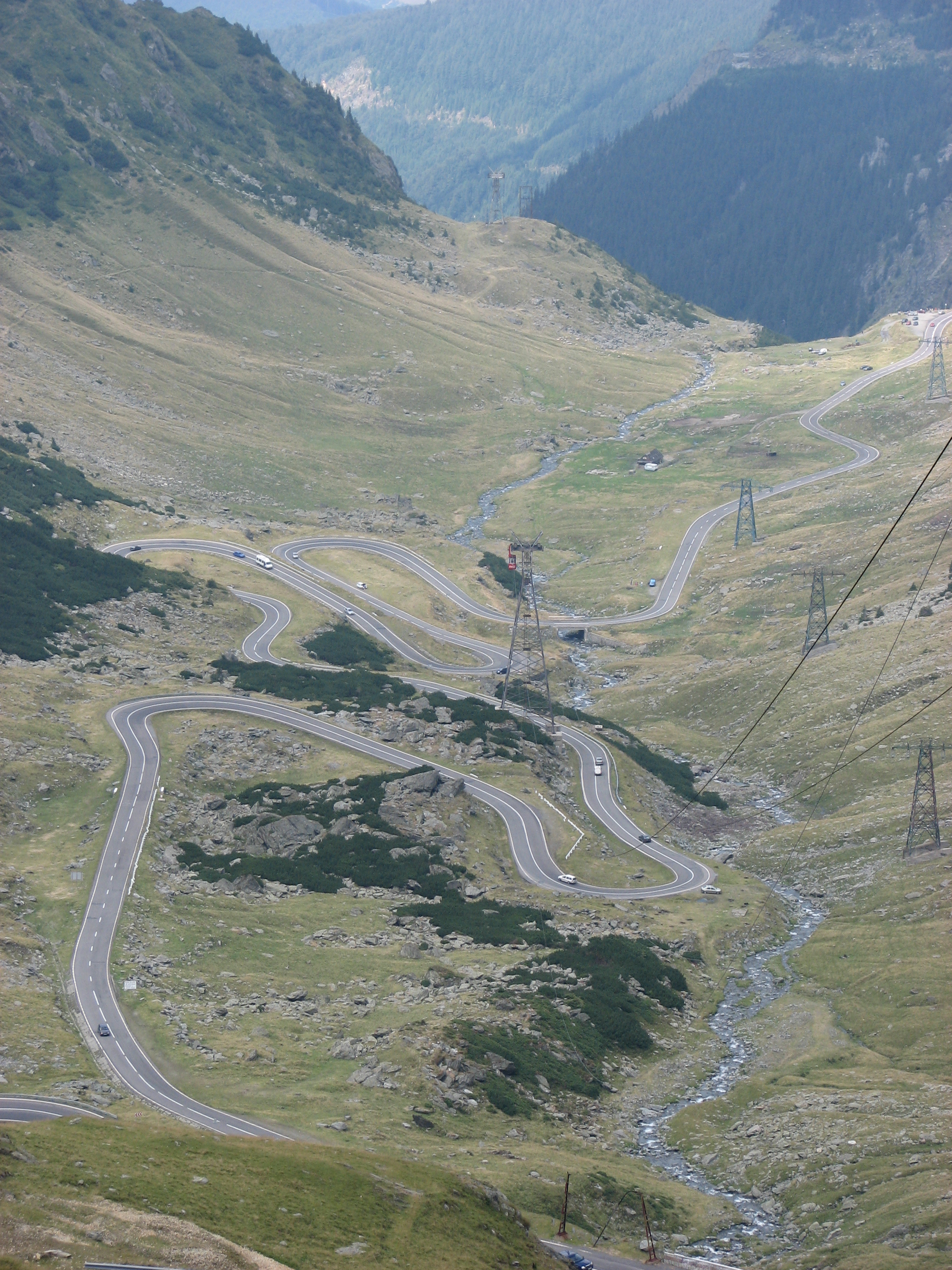
Lower section of the road

Built mainly by military forces, the road had a high financial and human cost. Work was carried out in an alpine climate, at an elevation of 2,000 metres (6,600 ft), using roughly six million kilograms (5,900 long tons; 6,600 short tons) of dynamite, and employing junior military personnel who were untrained in blasting techniques. Many workers died; official records state that only 40 soldiers lost their lives, but unofficial estimates by workers put the number in the hundreds.

The road was officially opened on 20 September 1974, although work, particularly paving of the roadbed, continued until 1980.

== Route ==
The road climbs to an altitude of 2,042 metres (6,699 ft), making it the second highest mountain pass in Romania after the Transalpina. It is a winding road, dotted with steep hairpin turns, long S-curves, and sharp descents. It is both an attraction and a challenge for hikers, cyclists, drivers and motorcycle enthusiasts. Due to the topography, the average speed is around 40 km/h (25 mph). The road also provides access to Bâlea Lake and Bâlea Waterfall.

The road is usually closed from late October until late June because of snow. Depending on the weather, it may remain open until as late as November, or may close even in the summer; signs at the town of Curtea de Argeș and the village of Cârțișoara provide information.

The Transfăgărășan has more tunnels (a total of 5) and viaducts than any other road in Romania. Near the highest point, at Bâlea Lake, the road passes through Bâlea Tunnel, the longest road tunnel in Romania at 884 m (2,900 ft).

Along the southern section of the road, near the village of Arefu, is Poenari Castle. The castle was the residence of Vlad Tepes, also known as Vlad the Impaler, who is said to have been the inspiration for Bram Stoker's Count Dracula. However, Bram Stoker never stated that Tepes was the inspiration for Dracula, only borrowing the name as evidenced in his notes and Stoker himself never visited Romania. Some allege that the castle Stoker used in his novel for illustration was Castelul Bran, the only castle in the region that remains intact, though Bran Castle does not appear in Stoker's notes.

The northern section is used for annual cycling competitions, including the Tour of Romania, and the 22 km (14 mi) section to Bâlea Lake has been used since 2011 for the Sibiu Cycling Tour. These sections are considered to be similar in difficulty to hors catégorie climbs in the Tour de France.

== Appearance in Top Gear ==
The Transfăgărășan was featured in a segment of the British TV show Top Gear, in the first episode of Series 14 (November 2009). Host Jeremy Clarkson proclaimed that the Transfăgărășan was "the best road in the world", a title the presenters had previously given to the Stelvio Pass in Italy. The road has also been dubbed "Ceaușescu's Folly".

== Gallery ==
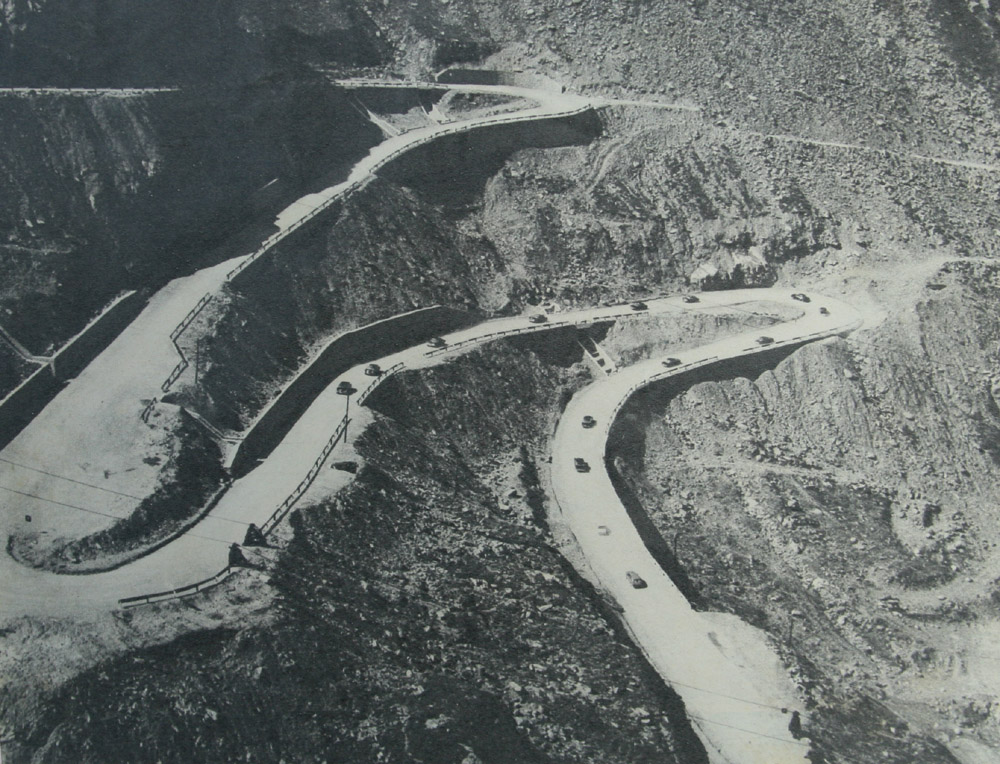
Transfăgărășan in 1974

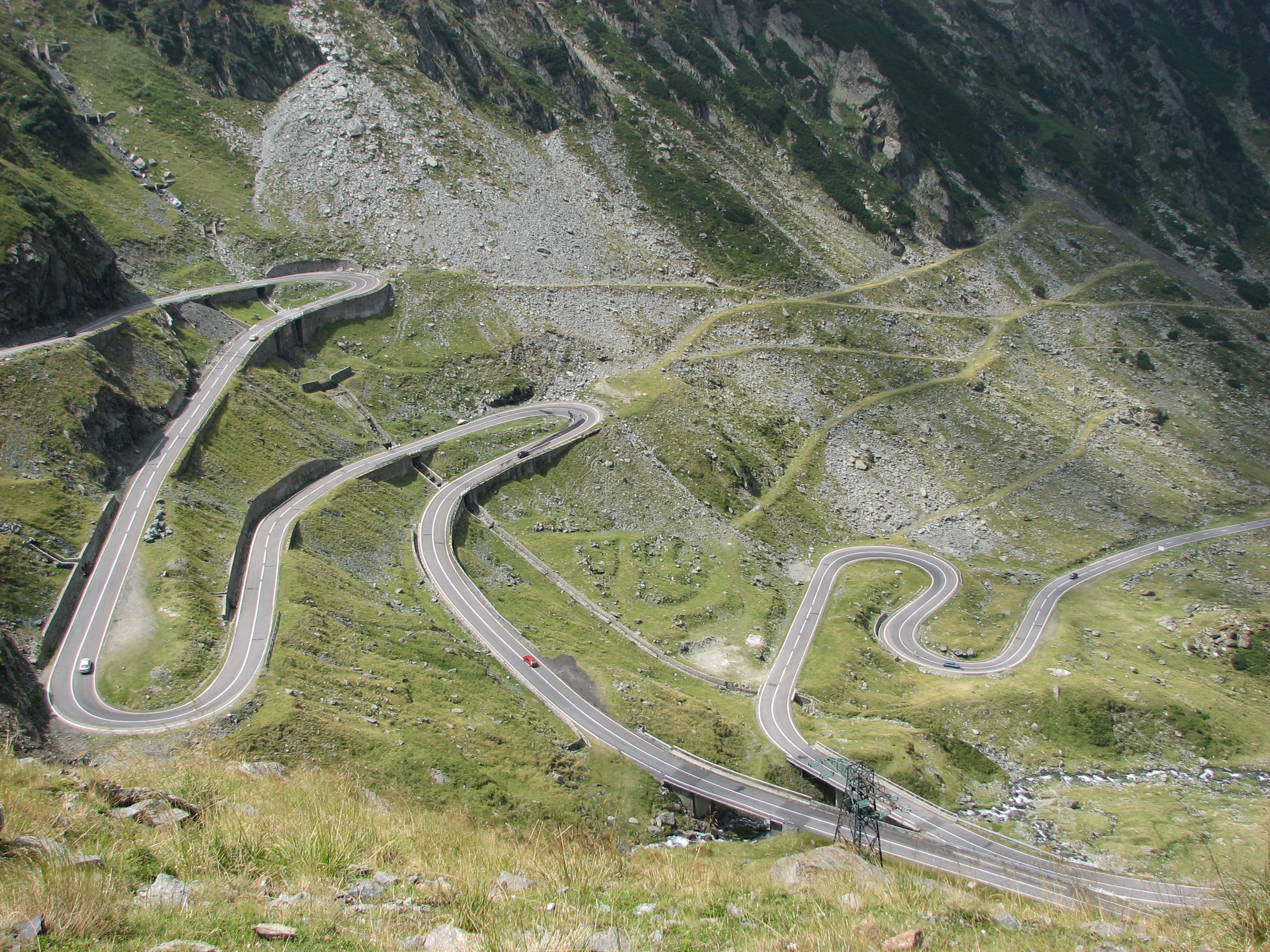
Same section of the road in 2007

Northern part of the road

== See also ==
- List of highest paved roads in Europe
- List of mountain passes
- Seven Wonders of Romania
- Trollstigen
- Tourism in Romania
