= Cârțișoara =

- Commune
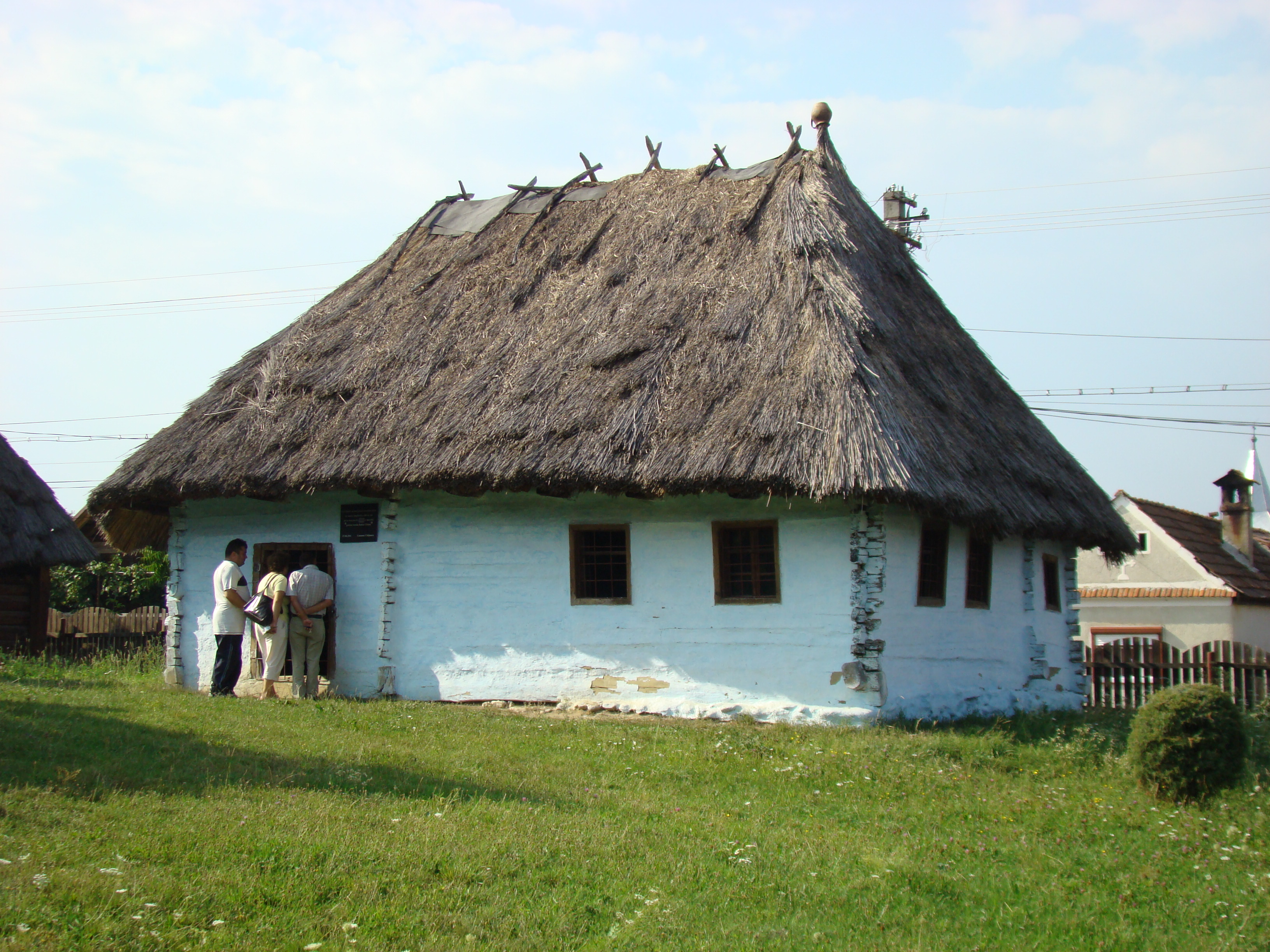
- Badea Cârțan memorial house in Cârțișoara

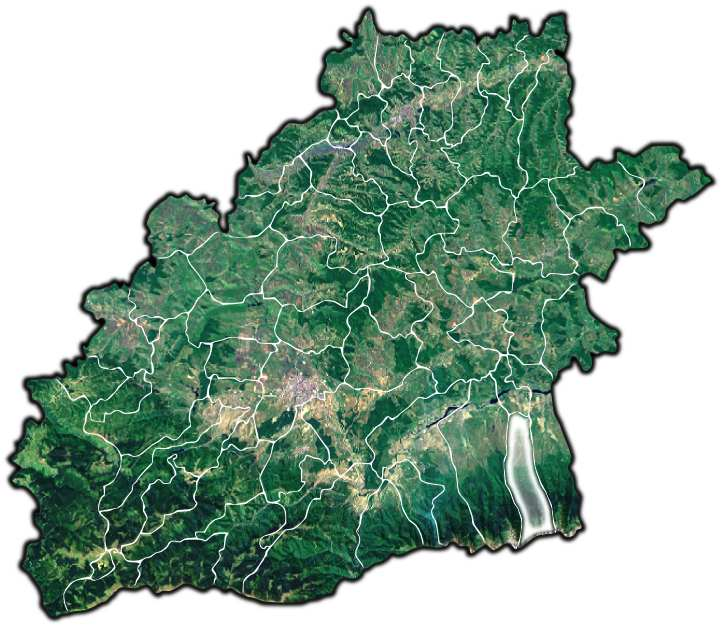
- Location in Sibiu County

- Location in Romania
- Coordinates: 45°43′26″N 24°34′45″E
- Country: Romania
- County: Sibiu
- Established: 1223

Government
  - Mayor (2020–2024): Vasilică-Sorin Cîrțan (PSD)
- Area: 85.7 km^{2} (33.1 sq mi)
- Population (2021-12-01): 1,260
  - Density: 14.7/km^{2} (38.1/sq mi)
- Time zone: UTC+02:00 (EET)
  - Summer (DST): UTC+03:00 (EEST)
- Postal code: 557075
- Area code: +(40) 0269
- Vehicle reg.: SB
- Website: comunacirtisoara-sibiu.ro

Cârțișoara (also Cârța Românească; German: Kleinkerz; Hungarian: Kercisóra) is a commune in Sibiu County, Transylvania, Romania. It is composed of a single village, Cârțișoara. Bâlea Lake is located on the territory of Cârțișoara.

The commune is located in the southeastern part of the county, 48 km (30 mi) from the county seat, Sibiu, and 38 km (24 mi) from Făgăraș. Cârțișoara is situated at the western edge of Țara Făgărașului, on the northern side of the Southern Carpathians, at the foot of the Făgăraș Mountains; it lies on the border with Argeș County and near the borders with Vâlcea and Brașov counties. The commune sits on the left bank of the river Cârțișoara, which flows south to north, discharging into the Olt River.

At the 2011 census, Cârțișoara had a population of 1,243 inhabitants, of which 96.3% were ethnic Romanians. At the 2021 census, the commune had 1,260 inhabitants, of which 90.87% were Romanians.

== Tourist attractions ==
- Badea Cârțan Museum
- Bâlea Lake
- Bâlea Lake Ice Hotel
- Bâlea Waterfall
- Cârțișoara Monastery
- Făgăraș Mountains
- Transfăgărășan
- Water mill

== Natives ==
- Badea Cârțan (1849–1911), shepherd who fought for the independence of the Romanians of Transylvania
