= Lespezi (disambiguation) =

Lespezi is a commune in Iaşi County, Romania.

Lespezi may also refer to:

- Lespezi, a village in Hârtiești Commune, Argeș County, Romania
- Lespezi, a village in Gârleni Commune, Bacău County, Romania
- Lespezi, a village in Dobromir Commune, Constanţa County, Romania
- Lespezi, a village in Râmnicu Vâlcea city, Vâlcea County, Romania
- Lespezi, a village in Homocea Commune, Vrancea County, Romania
- Lespezi, a mountain in Romania

== See also ==
- Lespezi River (disambiguation)
