= Badea Cârțan =

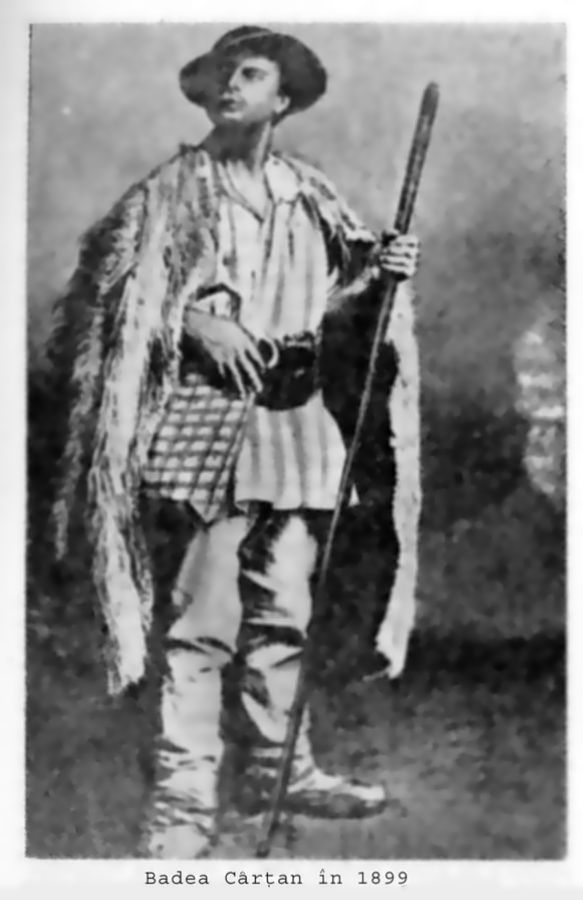
- Born: Gheorghe Cârțan; January 24, 1849; Cârțișoara, Austrian Empire
- Died: August 7, 1911 (aged 62)
- Occupation: Shepherd

Badea Cârțan (roughly: Elder Brother Cârțan – the common nickname of Gheorghe Cârțan; 24 January 1849 – 7 August 1911) was a self-taught ethnic Romanian shepherd who fought for the independence of the Romanians of Transylvania (then under Hungarian rule inside Austria-Hungary), distributing Romanian-language books that he secretly brought from Romania to their villages. In all he smuggled some 200,000 books for pupils, priests, teachers and peasants; he used several routes to pass through the Făgăraş Mountains.

He was born in Kercisóra, present-day Cârțișoara, Sibiu County, the second child of poor peasants (Nicolae and Ludovica) who were former serfs, and he spent his childhood tending sheep at the edge of his village. In between his later brushes with fame, he would always return to this activity. He became the head of his family on 2 October 1865 with the death of his father.

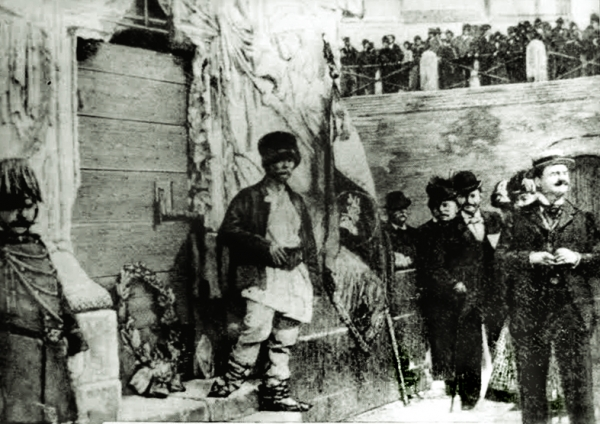
Badea Cârțan at Rome, at the base of Trajan Column.

Cârţan first crossed the mountains into the Romanian Old Kingdom with his sheep and a friend at the age of 18, and it was at that time that his interest in Romanian national unity became powerful. In 1877 he enrolled as a volunteer in the Romanian War of Independence, serving until 1881. In 1895 he travelled to Vác and Szeged to visit imprisoned Romanians, including the signatories of the Transylvanian Memorandum. Badea Cârțan himself was arrested twice: once because he asked the Emperor-King Franz Joseph at Vienna for Transylvania's self-determination, and once because he asked the authorities for permission to sell Romanian books.

Cârțan made a journey on foot to Rome, and when he arrived at the city's edge after 45 days, said, "Bine te-am găsit, maica Roma" ("Pleased to meet you, mother Rome"). He wished to see Trajan's Column with his own eyes, as well as other evidences of the Latin origin of the Romanian people. After pouring Romanian soil and wheat at the column's base, he wrapped himself in a peasant's coat (cojoc) and fell asleep at the column's base. The next day he was awakened by a policeman who shouted in amazement, "A Dacian has fallen off the column!", as Cârţan was dressed just like the Dacians carved into the column; the event was reported in Roman newspapers and Duiliu Zamfirescu, Romanian representative in Italy, showed him around the city and introduced him to its important personalities. This January-February 1896 trip was but one of three visits to Rome; on his last, in October 1899, on the occasion of a meeting of the International Congress of Orientalists, he laid a wreath at the column's base.

Cârțan also visited France, Spain, Belgium, Switzerland, Germany, Egypt and Jerusalem.

He was buried in Sinaia, on soil belonging to independent Romania (Transylvania still being seven years away from its post-World War I union with Romania); on the stone cross atop his grave is inscribed the phrase: "Aici doarme Badea Cârțan visând întregirea neamului său" ("Here lies Badea Cârțan dreaming of the unity of his people").
