= Lespezi River =

Lespezi River may refer to:

- Lespezi, a tributary of the Argeș in Argeș County
- Lespezi, a tributary of the Izvorul Alb in Bacău County
- Lespezi, a tributary of the Olteț in Gorj County
- Lespezi, a tributary of the Râul Târgului in Argeș County

== See also ==
- Lespezi (disambiguation)
