= Viștea Mare =

Mountain in Romania

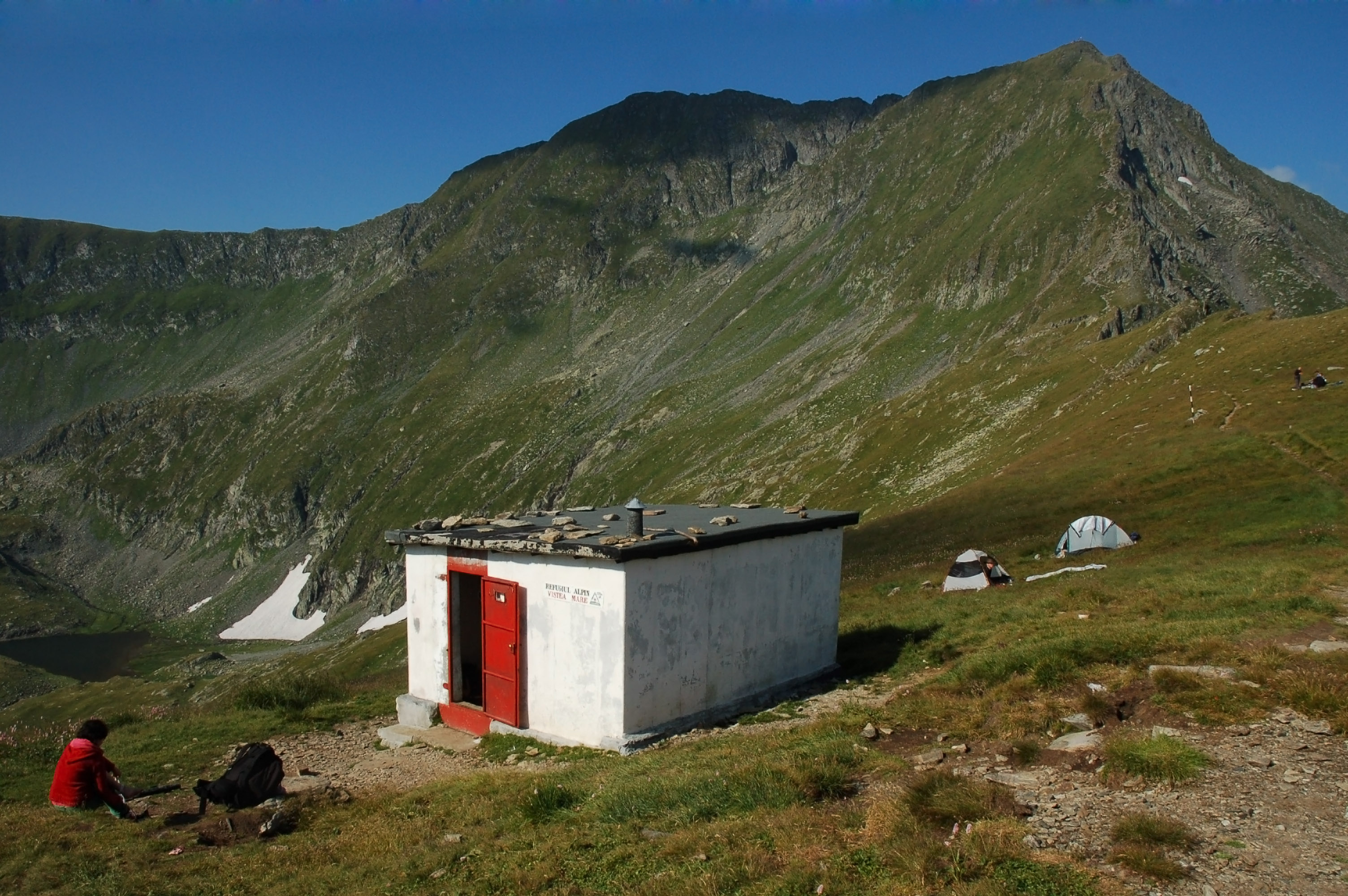
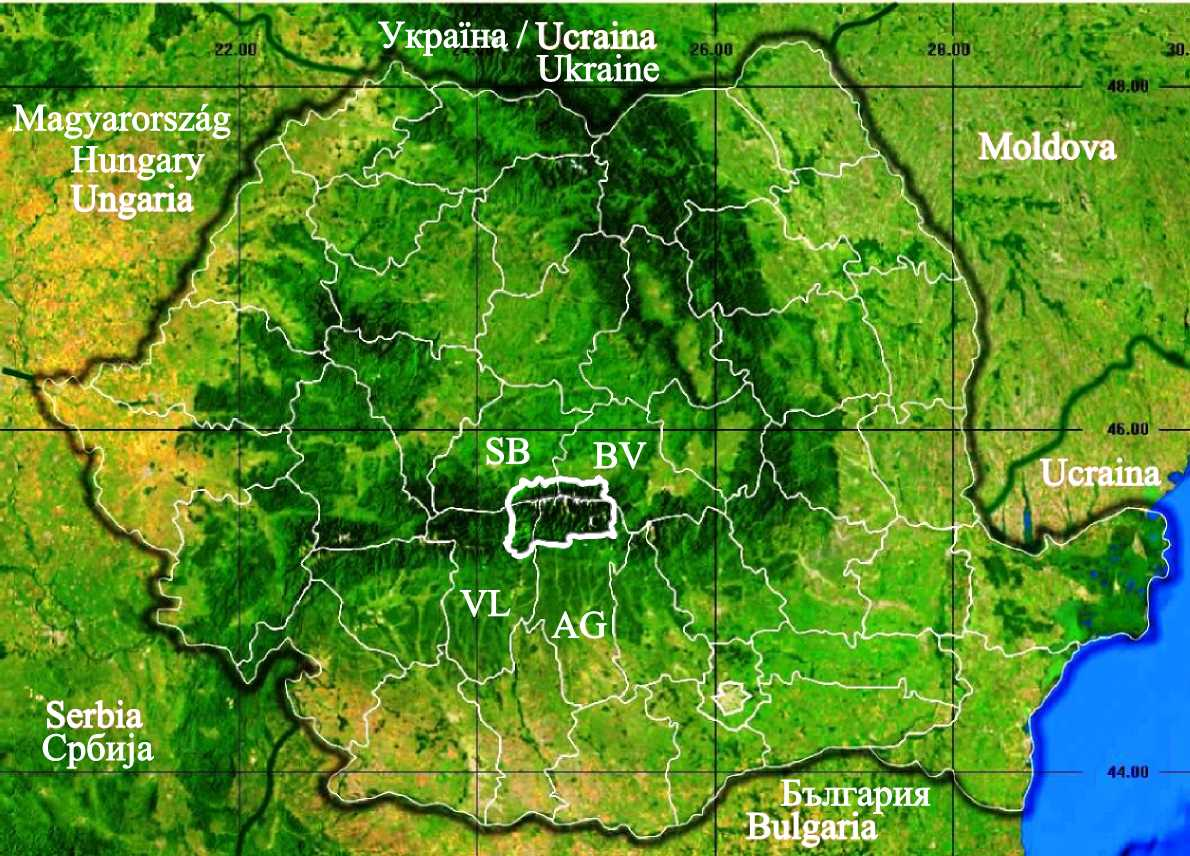
- Moldoveanu (left) and Viștea Mare (right) from Viștea Refuge Făgăraș Mountains on the map of Romania

Highest point
- Elevation: 2,527 m (8,291 ft)
- Prominence: 29 m (95 ft)
- Listing: List of mountains in Romania
- Coordinates: 45°36′10″N 24°44′10″E

Geography
- Location within Făgăraș Mountains
- Location: Brașov County, Romania
- Parent range: Făgăraș Mountains, Southern Carpathians

Climbing
- Easiest route: Scramble

Viștea Mare (Romanian pronunciation: [ˈviʃte̯a ˈmare]) is a mountain peak in the Făgăraș Mountains of the Southern Carpathians of Brașov County in Romania. With an elevation of 2,527 metres (8,291 ft), it is the third highest peak in Romania after Moldoveanu Peak (2,544 m) and Negoiu Peak (2,535 m).
