= Bâlea Lake =

Periglacial lake in Romania

Lacul Bâlea
- Bílea-tó
- Bâlea Lake, October 2006

- Location within Romania
- Location: Făgăraș Mountains
- Coordinates: 45.602°N 24.617°E
- Type: periglacial
- Basin countries: Romania
- Max. length: 360 m (1,180 ft)
- Max. width: 190 m (620 ft)
- Surface area: 4.7 ha (12 acres)
- Average depth: 11.35 m (37.2 ft)
- Surface elevation: 2,034 m (6,673 ft)

Bâlea Lake (Romanian: Lacul Bâlea, pronounced [ˈbɨle̯a]; Hungarian: Bilea-tó) is a glacier lake situated at an altitude of 2,034 m (6,673 ft) in the Făgăraș Mountains, in central Romania, near Cârțișoara, Sibiu County. There are two chalets opened all year round, a meteorological station, and a mountain rescue (Salvamont) station. The lake is accessible by car via the Transfăgărășan road during the summer, and the rest of the year, access is provided by a cable car from the "Bâlea Cascadă" chalet.

On 17 April 1977, an avalanche killed 23 skiers who had gathered near Bâlea lake. Among them, 19 were high school students from the Samuel von Brukenthal National College in Sibiu. This marked the deadliest avalanche in Romania's history, with the 42nd highest death toll in the world.

In 2006, the first ice hotel in Eastern Europe was built in the vicinity of the lake. The hotel has been open for 15 years since its inception, but it did not operate during the 2019–2020 season due to higher than usual temperatures.

== Climate ==
Climate data for Lake Bâlea (altitude 2054m, 2014–2026 normals, extremes 1981–present)
Month	Jan	Feb	Mar	Apr	May	Jun	Jul	Aug	Sep	Oct	Nov	Dec	Year
Record high °C (°F)	8.3 (46.9)	10.2 (50.4)	12.5 (54.5)	15.9 (60.6)	16.2 (61.2)	22.7 (72.9)	24.8 (76.6)	22.6 (72.7)	22.5 (72.5)	17.5 (63.5)	14.9 (58.8)	12.7 (54.9)	24.8 (76.6)
Mean daily maximum °C (°F)	−3.5 (25.7)	−2.4 (27.7)	−0.2 (31.6)	3.5 (38.3)	6.9 (44.4)	11.6 (52.9)	13.3 (55.9)	13.9 (57.0)	9.8 (49.6)	6.4 (43.5)	2.6 (36.7)	−1.3 (29.7)	5.1 (41.1)
Daily mean °C (°F)	−6.5 (20.3)	−5.4 (22.3)	−3.4 (25.9)	0.3 (32.5)	4.2 (39.6)	9.1 (48.4)	10.8 (51.4)	11.4 (52.5)	7.4 (45.3)	3.6 (38.5)	−0.1 (31.8)	−4.0 (24.8)	2.3 (36.1)
Mean daily minimum °C (°F)	−9.5 (14.9)	−8.4 (16.9)	−6.5 (20.3)	−3.0 (26.6)	1.4 (34.5)	6.6 (43.9)	8.2 (46.8)	8.9 (48.0)	5.1 (41.2)	0.9 (33.6)	−2.8 (27.0)	−6.8 (19.8)	−0.5 (31.1)
Record low °C (°F)	−26.0 (−14.8)	−25.0 (−13.0)	−31.7 (−25.1)	−16.6 (2.1)	−9.0 (15.8)	−3.6 (25.5)	−1.0 (30.2)	−0.2 (31.6)	−7.4 (18.7)	−17.0 (1.4)	−20.8 (−5.4)	−22.6 (−8.7)	−31.7 (−25.1)
Average precipitation mm (inches)	129.5 (5.10)	94.0 (3.70)	106.5 (4.19)	114.4 (4.50)	179.7 (7.07)	201.8 (7.94)	216.4 (8.52)	139.1 (5.48)	130.0 (5.12)	91.9 (3.62)	110.0 (4.33)	110.5 (4.35)	1,623.8 (63.92)
Average precipitation days (≥ 1.0 mm)	14.8	12.6	13.8	13.2	15.6	14.4	15.0	10.8	10.7	10.2	12.7	12.4	156.2
Source: Meteomanz (2014-2026); Infoclimat (1980-2010)
