= Lespezi (mountain) =

Mountain in Romania

- Location within Romania

Highest point
- Elevation: 2,516 m (8,255 ft)
- Prominence: 216 m (709 ft)
- Coordinates: 45°34′40″N 24°34′11″E

Geography
- Location: Romania
- Parent range: Făgăraș Mountains

Lespezi (2,516 m) is the fifth highest mountain peak in Romania. The mountain is located in Sibiu County in the Făgăraș Mountains.
