= Arpașu de Jos =

- Commune
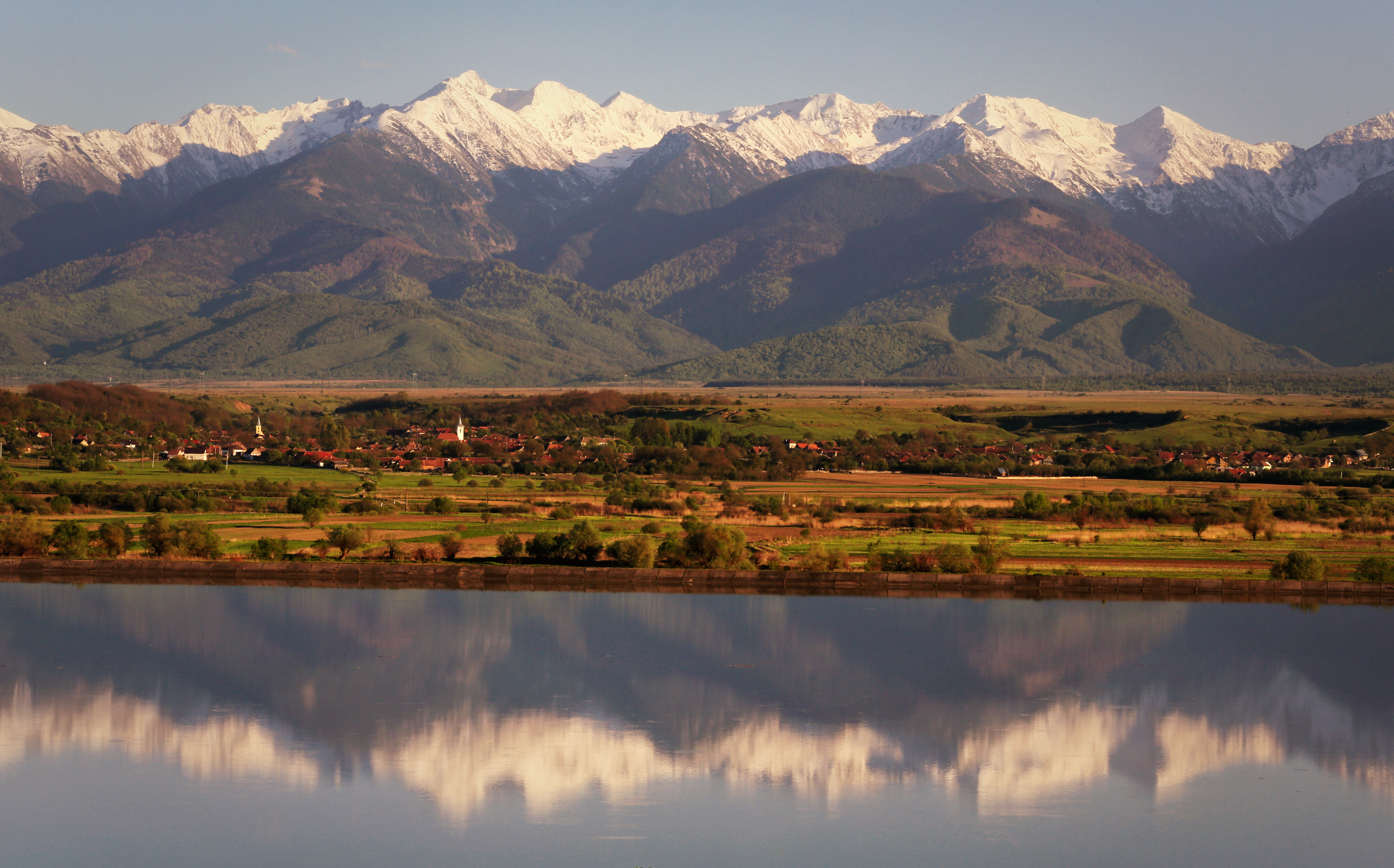
- Arpașu de Jos, with the Făgăraș Mountains in the background

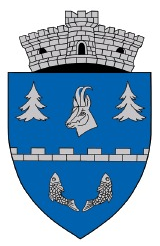
- Coat of arms

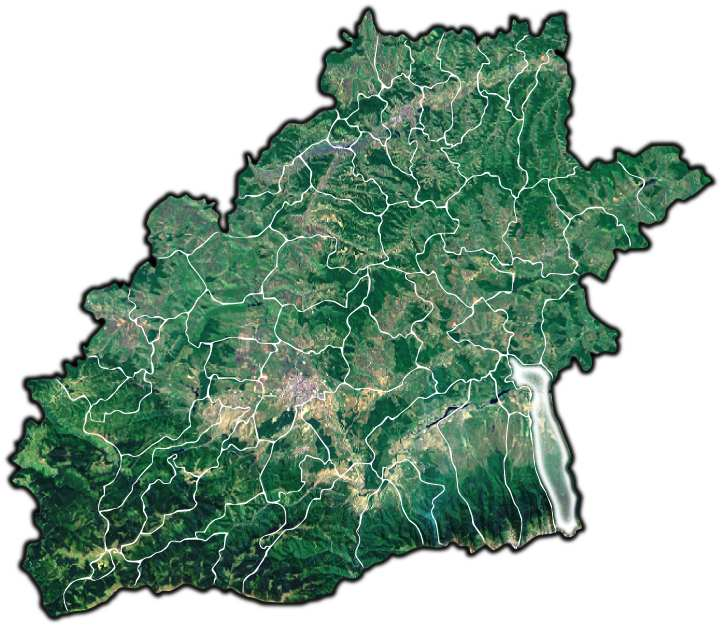
- Location in Sibiu County

- Location in Romania
- Coordinates: 45°47′N 24°37′E
- Country: Romania
- County: Sibiu

Government
  - Mayor (2024–2028): Vasile-Ioan Vasu (PSD)
- Area: 119.31 km^{2} (46.07 sq mi)
- Elevation: 424 m (1,391 ft)
- Population (2021-12-01): 2,594
  - Density: 21.74/km^{2} (56.31/sq mi)
- Time zone: UTC+02:00 (EET)
  - Summer (DST): UTC+03:00 (EEST)
- Postal code: 557015
- Area code: (+40) 02 69
- Vehicle reg.: SB
- Website: primariaarpasudejos.ro

Arpașu de Jos (Hungarian: Alsóárpás) is a commune located in Sibiu County, Transylvania, Romania. It is composed of three villages: Arpașu de Jos, Arpașu de Sus (Felsőárpás), and Nou Român (German: Rumänisch Neudorf; Oláhújfalu).
