= Negoiu Peak =

Mountain in Romania

Negoiu
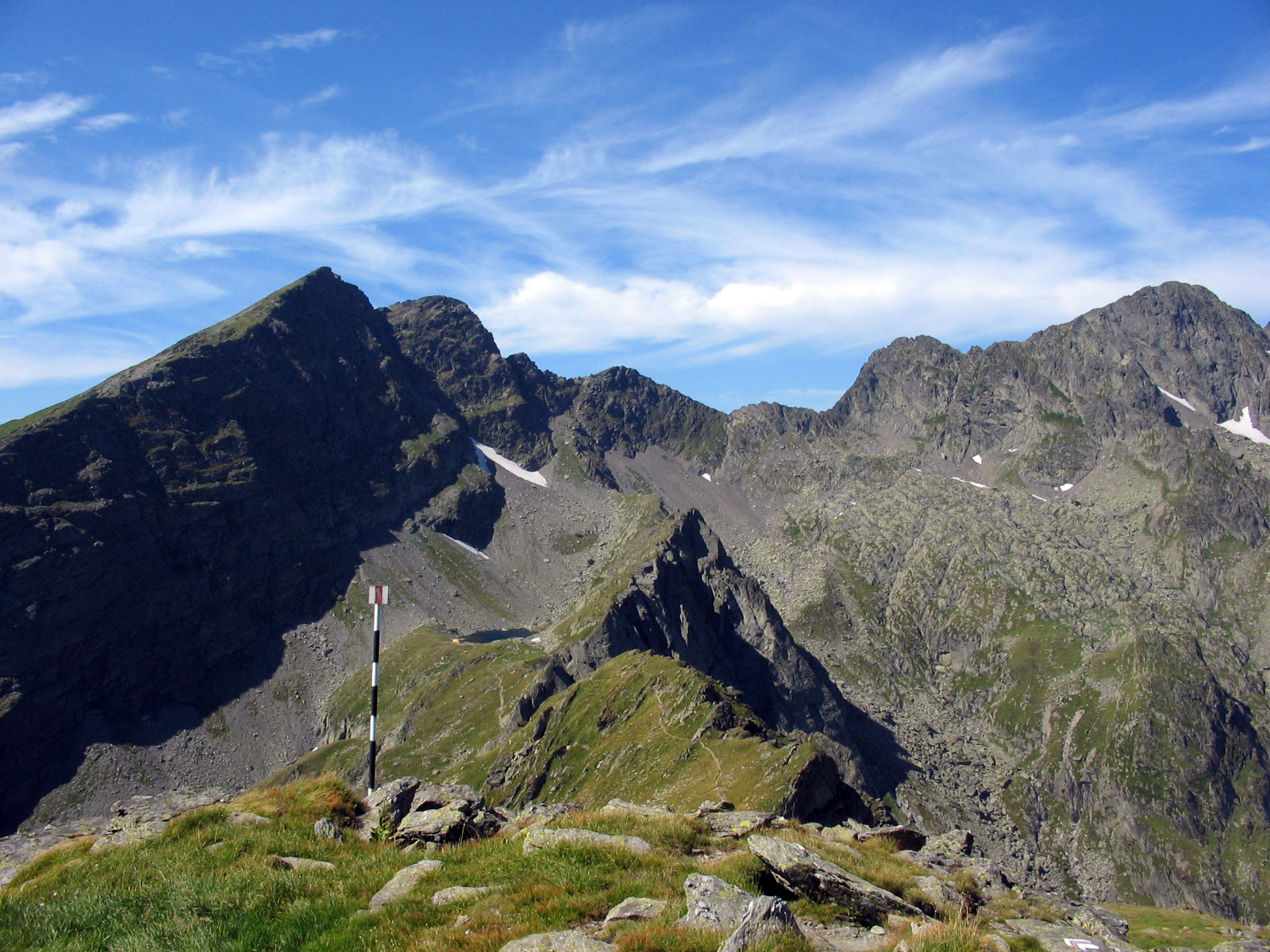
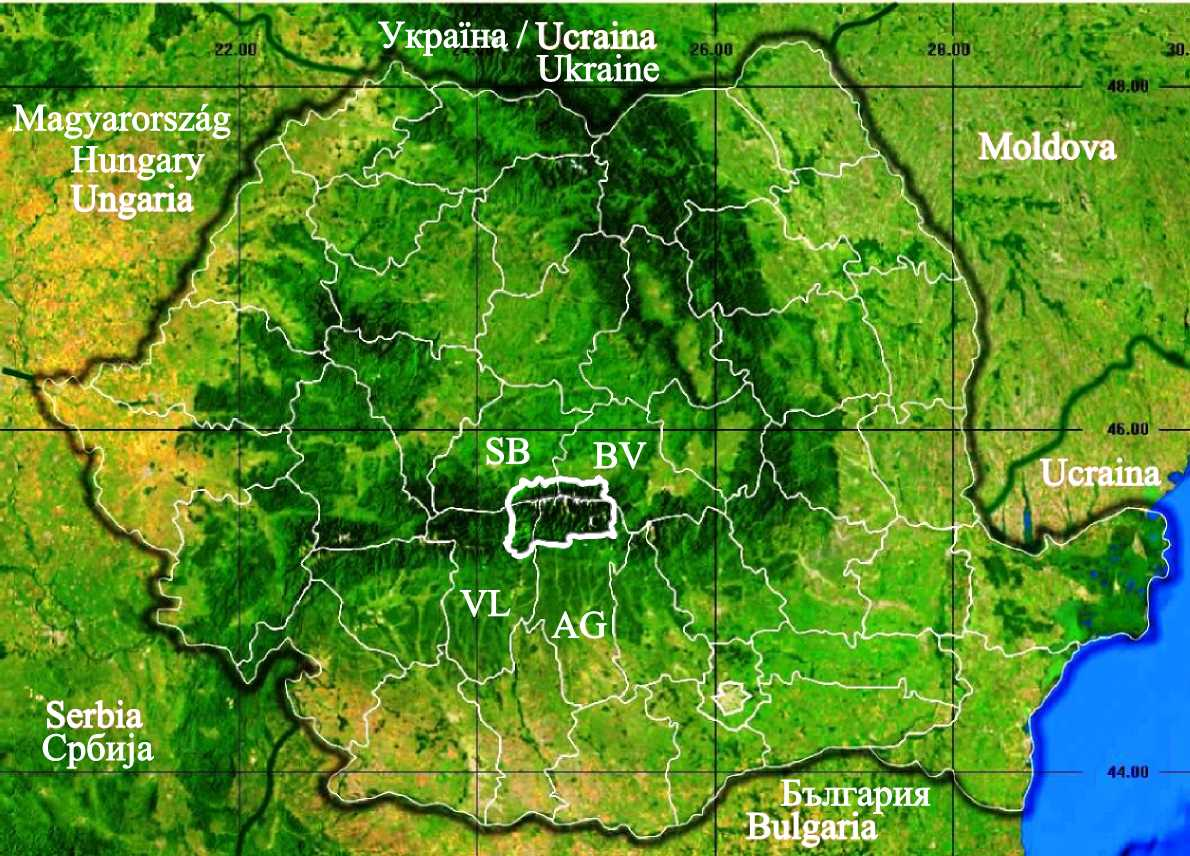
- Negoiu, first from the right. At the middle-left, Călțun Lake and Lespezi Peak Făgăraș Mountains on the map of Romania

Highest point
- Elevation: 2,535 m (8,317 ft)
- Prominence: 421 m (1,381 ft)
- Coordinates: 45°35′13″N 24°33′21″E

Geography
- Location within Făgăraș Mountains
- Location: Sibiu County, Romania
- Parent range: Făgăraș Mountains, Southern Carpathians

Climbing
- Easiest route: Scramble

Negoiu Peak (Romanian: Vârful Negoiu pronounced [neˈɡoju]; Hungarian: Negoj-csúcs) is a mountain peak in the Făgăraș Mountains of the Southern Carpathians, located in Sibiu County, Romania, with an elevation of 2,535 m (8,317 ft). It is the second highest peak in Romania after the 2,544 m (8,346 ft) Moldoveanu Peak.
