= Făgăraș Mountains =

Mountain range in Romania

- Romanian: Munții Făgăraș; Hungarian: Fogaras hegység
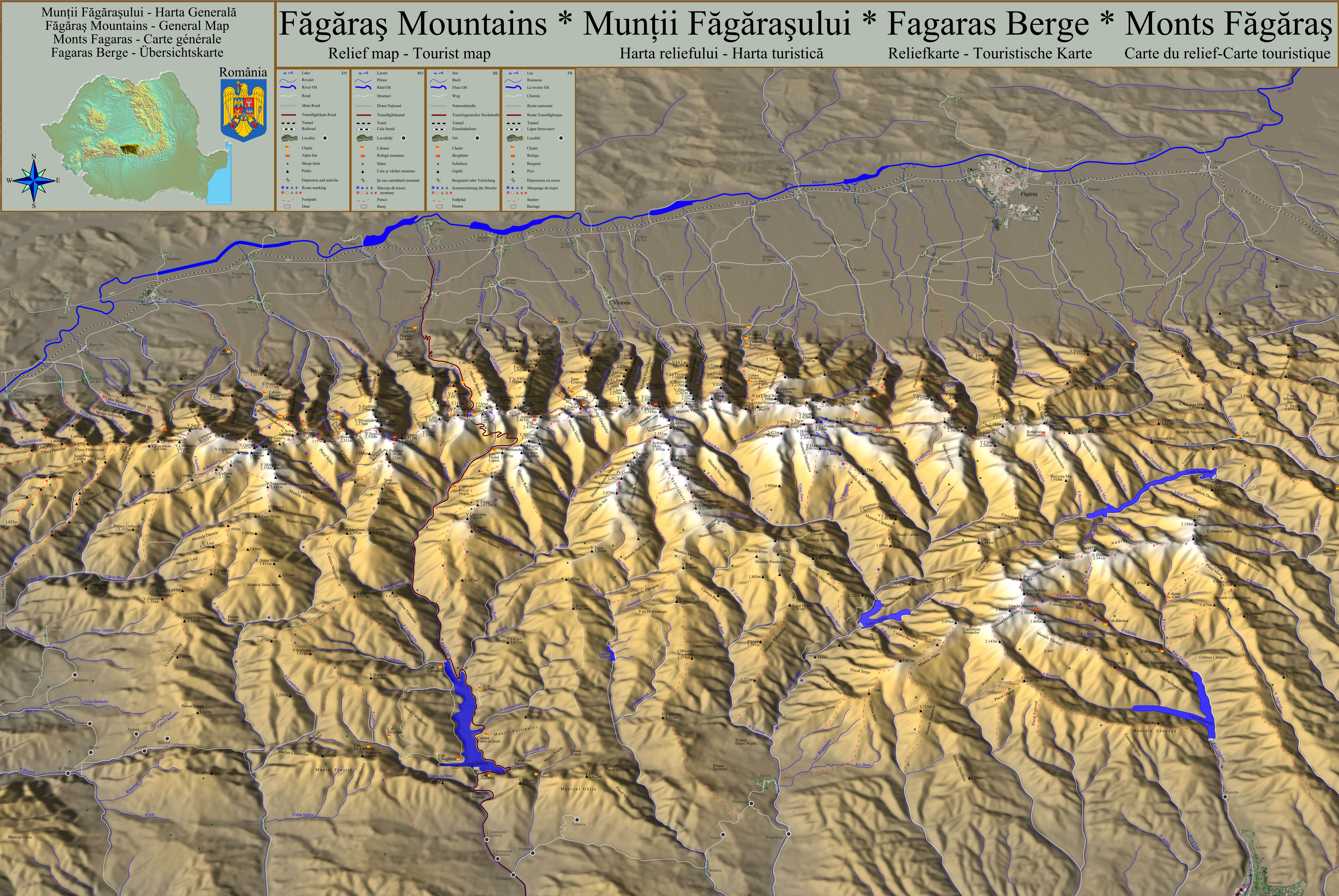
- Relief map - Tourist Map

Highest point
- Peak: Moldoveanu
- Elevation: 2,544 m (8,346 ft)

Geography
- Country: Romania
- Parent range: Carpathians

Geology
- Orogeny: Alpine orogeny
- Rock age: Mostly Triassic

Făgăraș Ridge

The Făgăraș Mountains (Romanian: Munții Făgărașului [ˈmuntsij fəɡəˈraʃuluj]; Hungarian: Fogarasi-havasok) are the highest mountains of the Southern Carpathians, in Romania.

== Geography ==
The mountain range is situated in the heart of Romania, at 45°35′N 24°45′E.

The range is bordered in the north by the Făgăraș Depression, through which the Olt River flows, and in the west by the Olt Valley (Valea Oltului). Despite its name, Făgăraș, located 20 km (12 mi) to the north, is not the nearest town to the mountain range, which has no major settlements. Other important surrounding cities are Brașov and Sibiu.

Glacier lakes include Bâlea (2,100 m, 46,508 m^{2}, 11.99 m deep), the largest. The highest lake is in the Hărtopul Leaotei glacial valley. The deepest glacial lake is Podragu (2,140 m, 28,550 m^{2}; 15.5 m deep). Other lakes are Urlea (2,170 m, 20,150 m^{2}) and Capra (2,230 m, 18,340 m^{2}).

The highest peaks are:

- Moldoveanu — 2,544 m (8,346 ft)
- Negoiu — 2,535 m (8,317 ft)
- Viștea Mare — 2,527 m (8,291 ft)
- Lespezi — 2,516 m (8,255 ft)
- Cornul Călțunului — 2,510 m (8,230 ft)
- Vânătoarea lui Buteanu — 2,507 m (8,225 ft)
- Hârtopul Darei — 2,506 m (8,222 ft)
- Dara — 2,501 m (8,205 ft)
- Scărișoara Mare — 2,495 m
- Mușetescu — 2,495 m
- Capra — 2,494 m
- Roșu — 2,489 m
- Negoiu Mic — 2,485 m
- Podragu — 2,482 m
- Urlea — 2,473 m

== Access and tourism ==
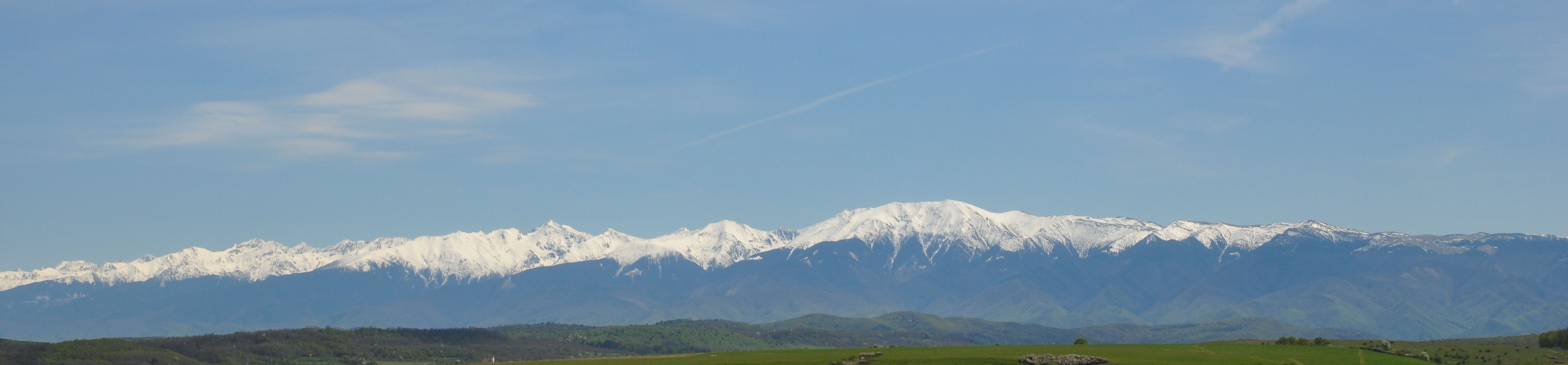
Panoramic view from Sibiu

The most used access point to the mountains is the Transfăgărășan road. The Transfăgărășan runs across the Făgăraș range. It is generally open only between June and September, due to unfavorable weather conditions for the rest of the year.

The Făgăraș Mountains are a very popular hiking, trekking and skiing destination in Romania. Most people wanting to hike on the Moldoveanu leave from the town of Victoria, or, in other areas of the Făgăraș Mountains, from Arpașu de Jos, Porumbacu de Jos, and Avrig. In the vicinity of the Negoiu peak, and in the central part of the band take the rocky nature of the mountains, and reaching the main ridge trail there are technical difficulties and exposure. Somewhat difficult part of the trail is a "Three steps from the death" running the main ridge by ridge Custura Arpașului the lake (in Romanian Lacul) Capra (2,230 m). Also a bit challenging is one of the ways to Negoiu – Strunga Dracului. The most difficult section of the ridge Custura Sărății is between Șerbota (2331 m above sea level) and Șaua Cleopatrei pass (2,355 m). At the root of the fire is under Șerbota several meters of steel cable handrail, on the other part there are no artificial enhancements.

== Conflicts ==
A decision to designate the mountains as a national park occurred in 2016, and has proven controversial with local people seeking to protect access to timber and forest products. In reality, the range has complex land tenure arrangements, so only a portion could be designated initially, aided by private investment. There are also plans to develop a ski resort, opposed by conservationists, but supported by many residents of the surrounding towns, who seek better livelihood and economic opportunities.

=== Image gallery ===
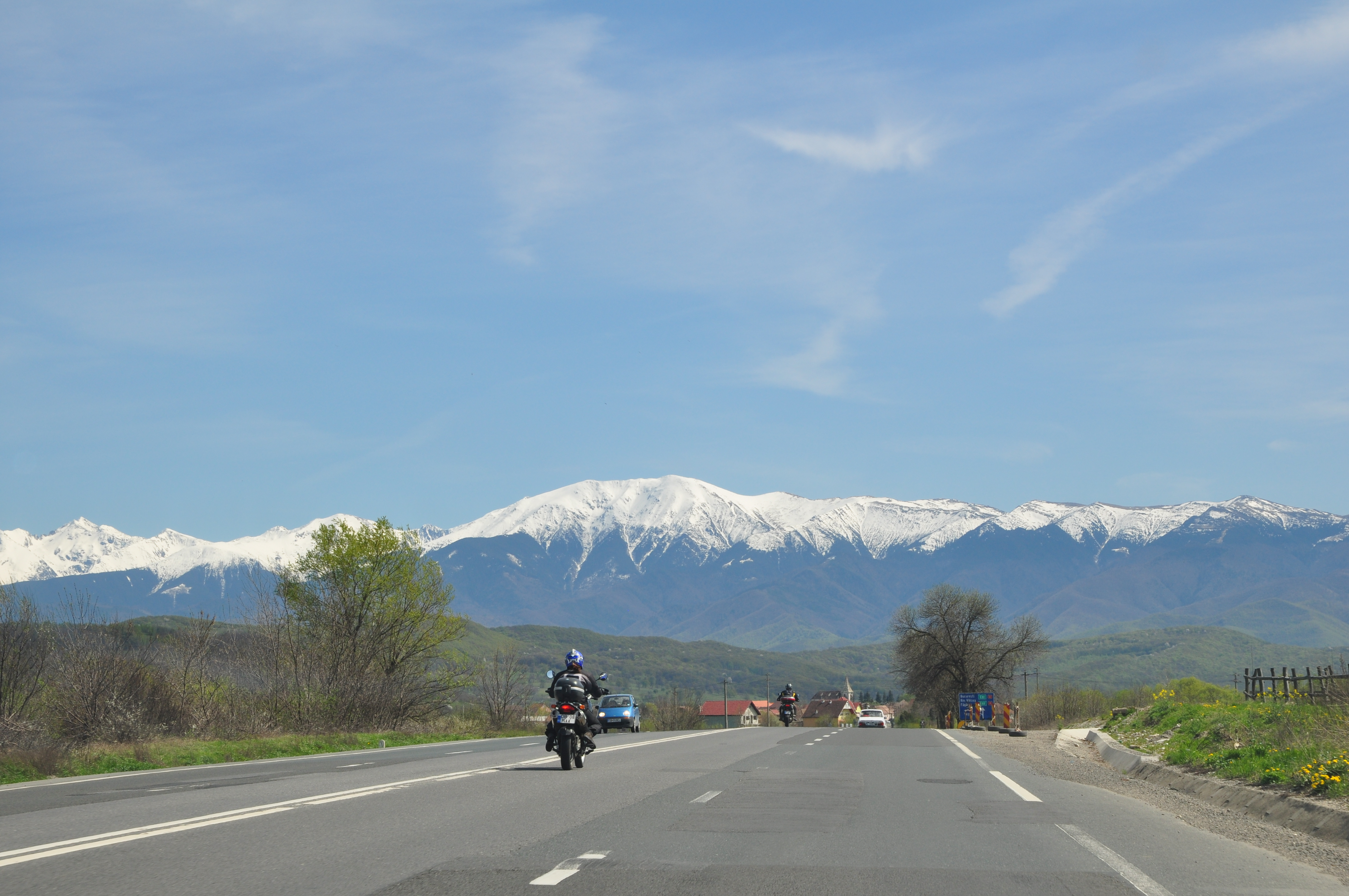
Towards the mountains

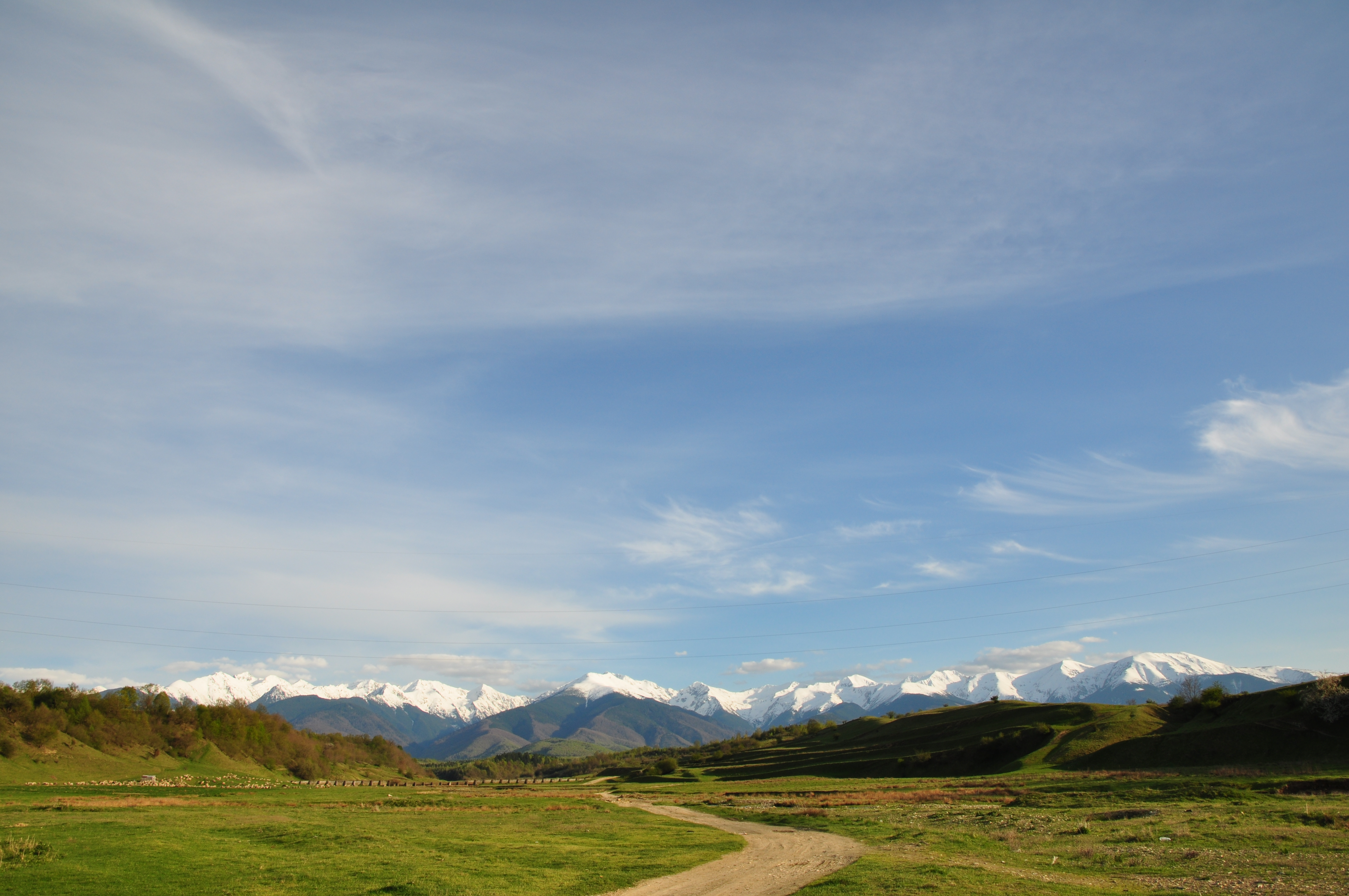
View from Sărata

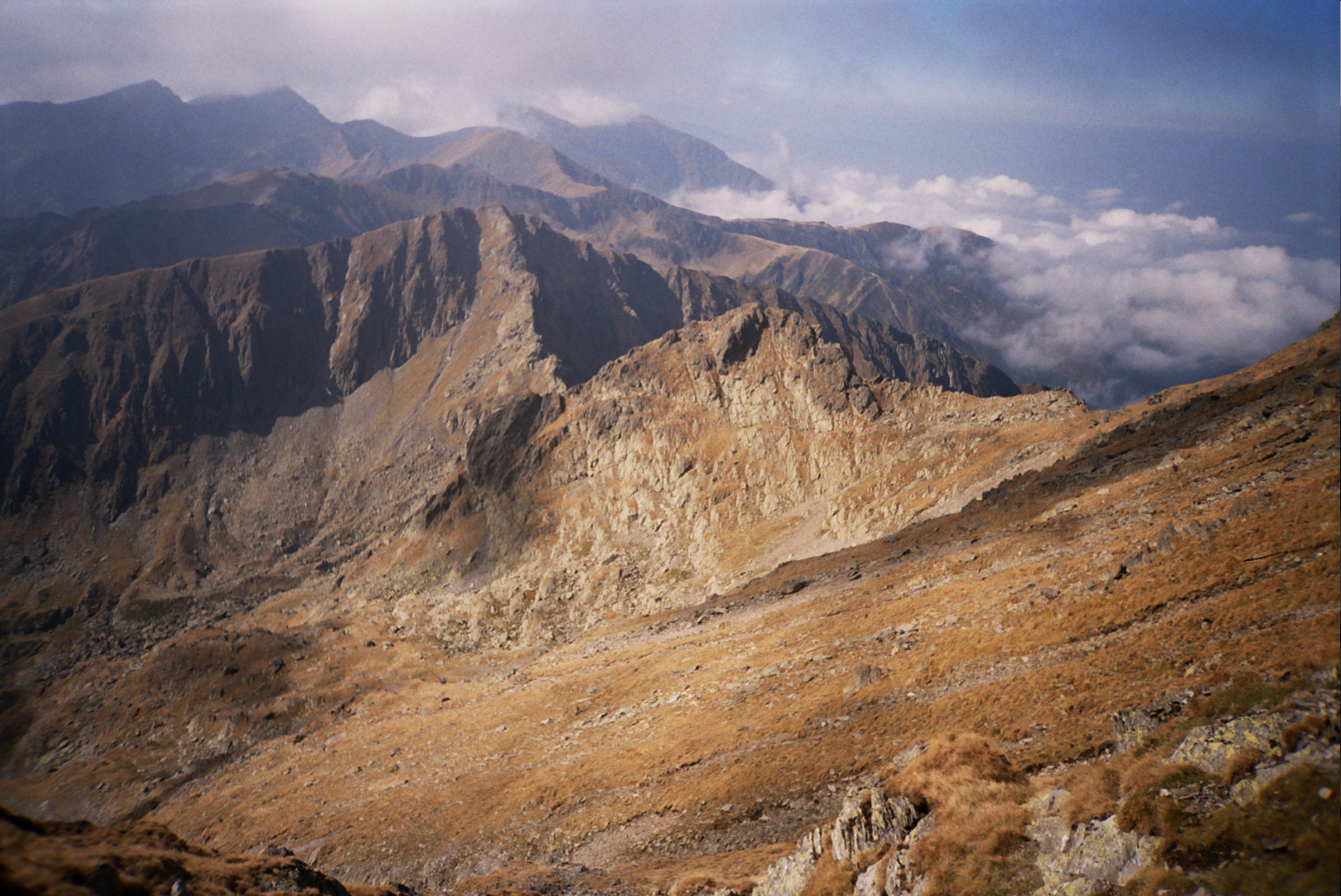
Făgăraș Mountains as viewed from Negoiu

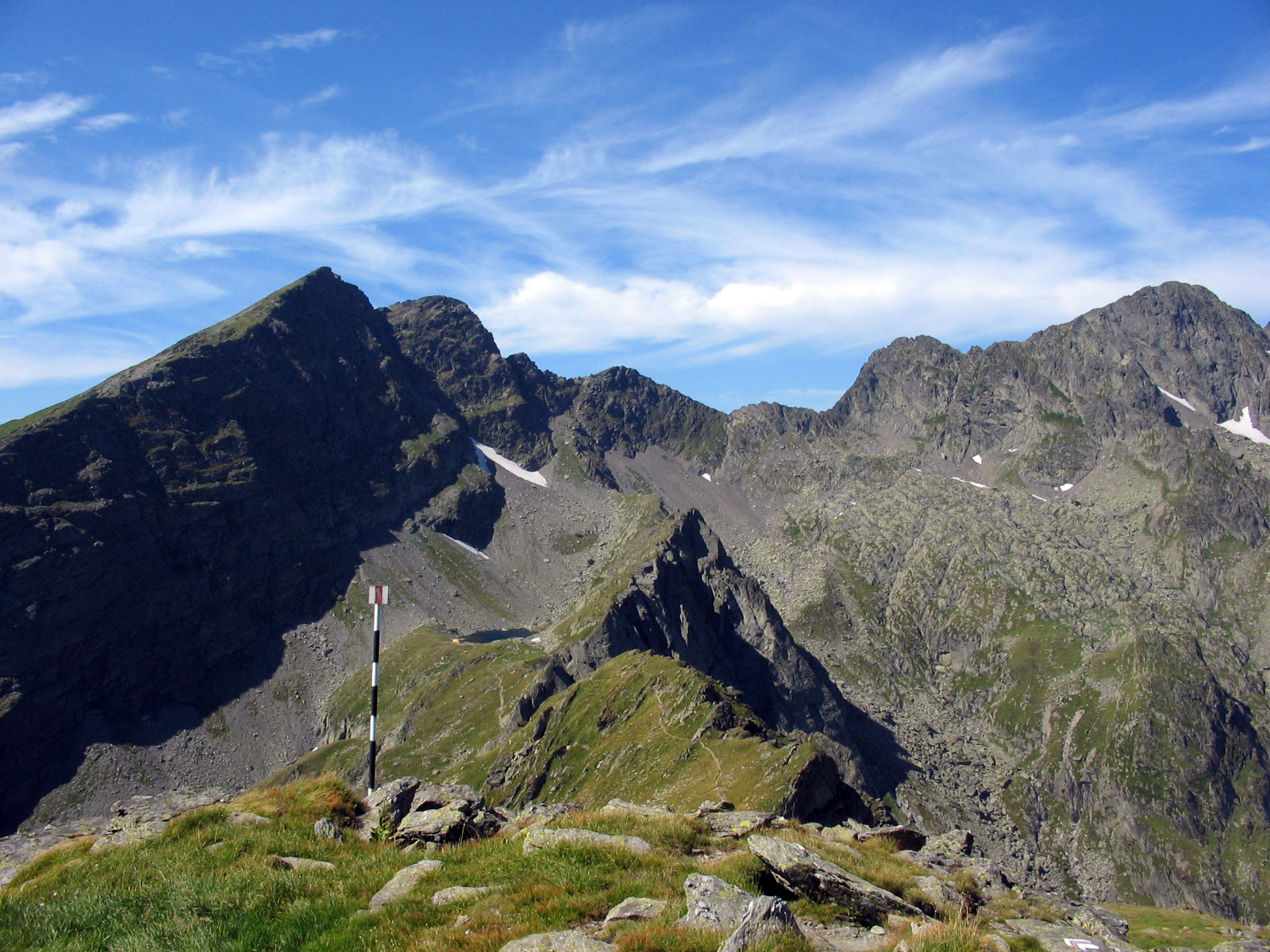
Negoiu Peak (2535m)

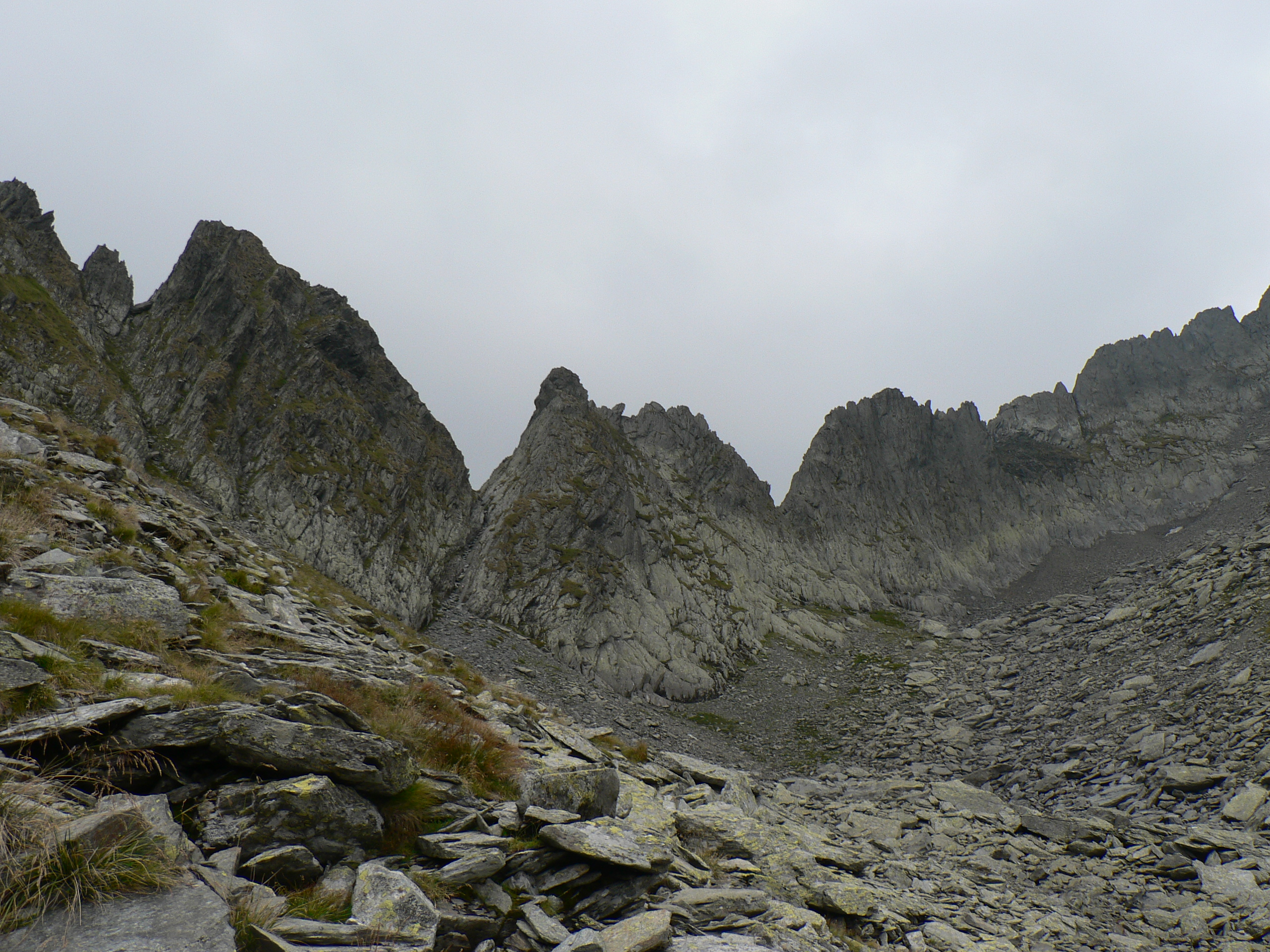
Amphitheatre

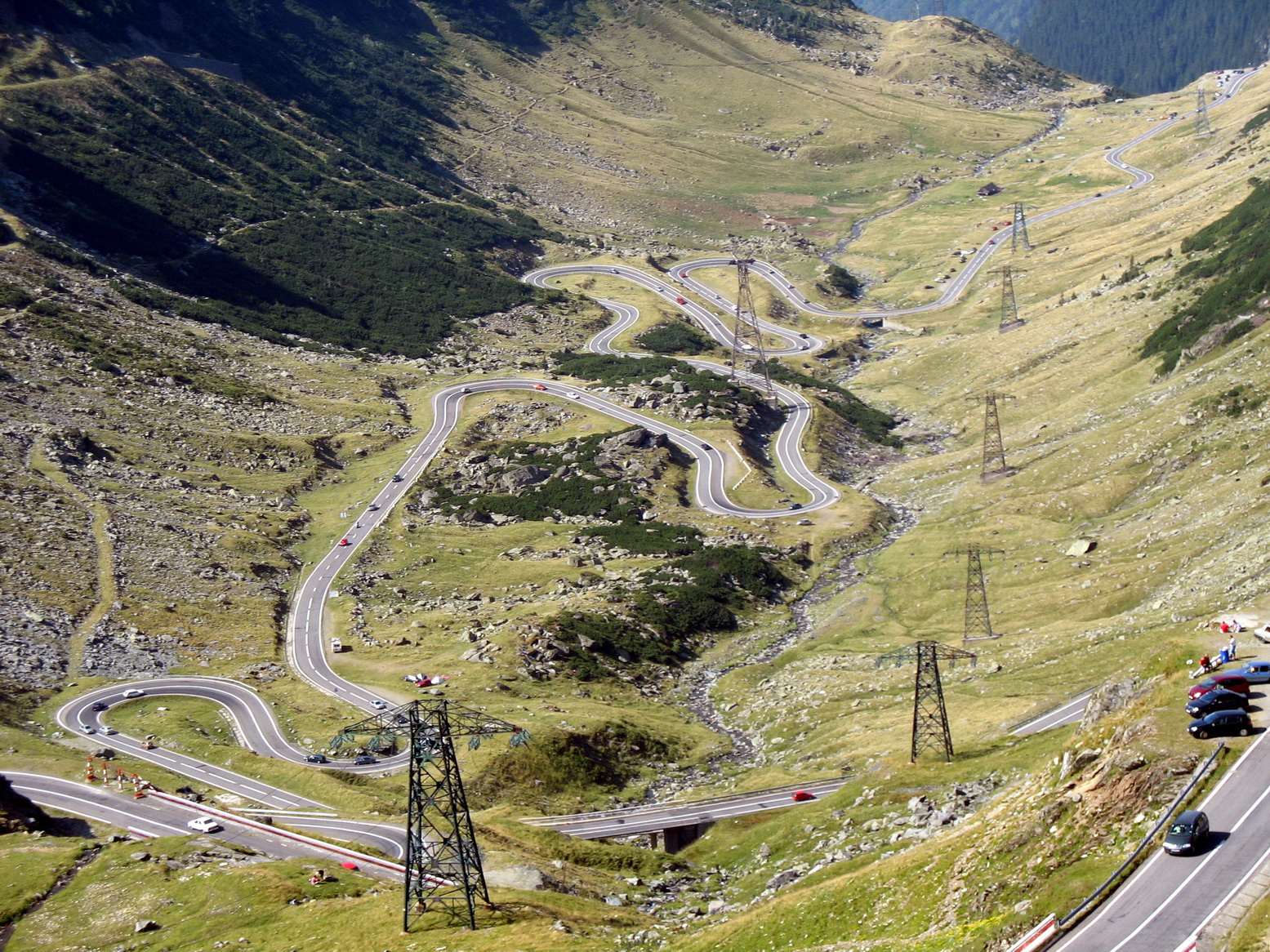
Transfăgărășan road DN7C

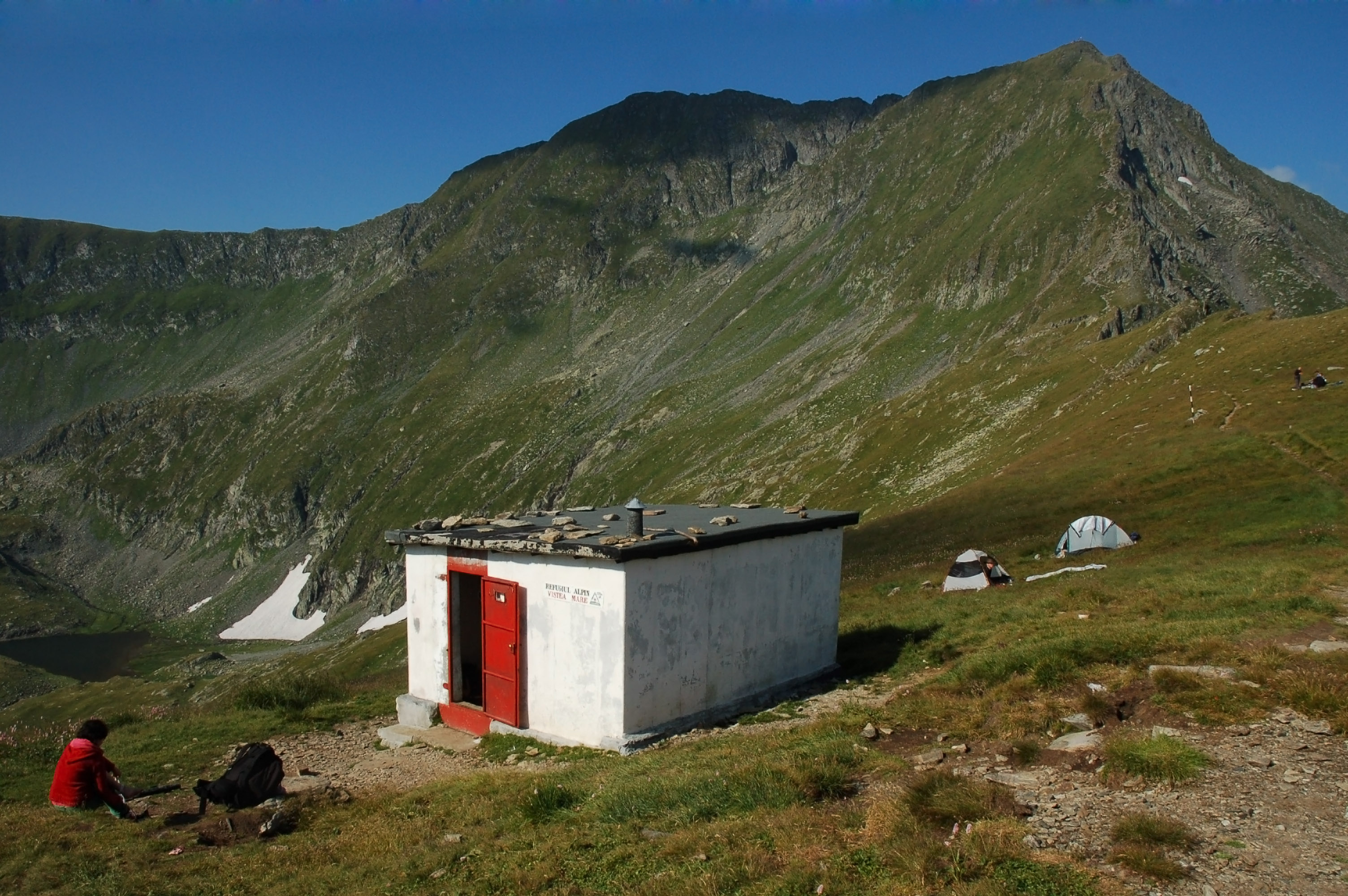
Moldoveanu peak and Viștea shelter

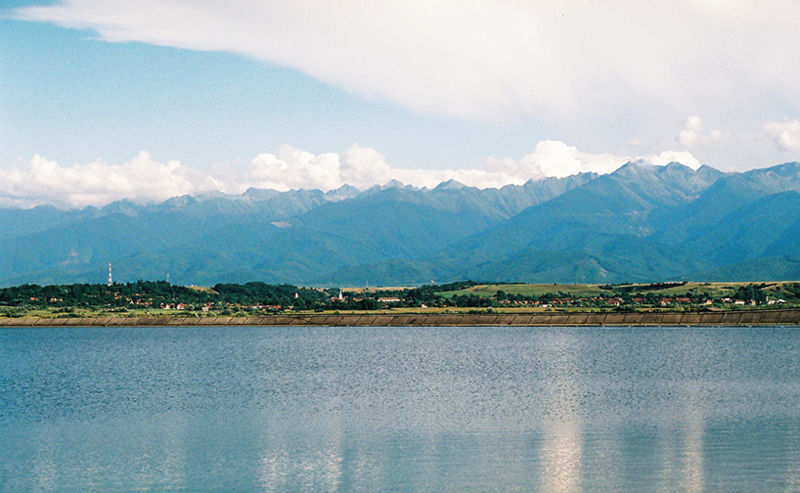
Făgăraș Mountains seen from Olt

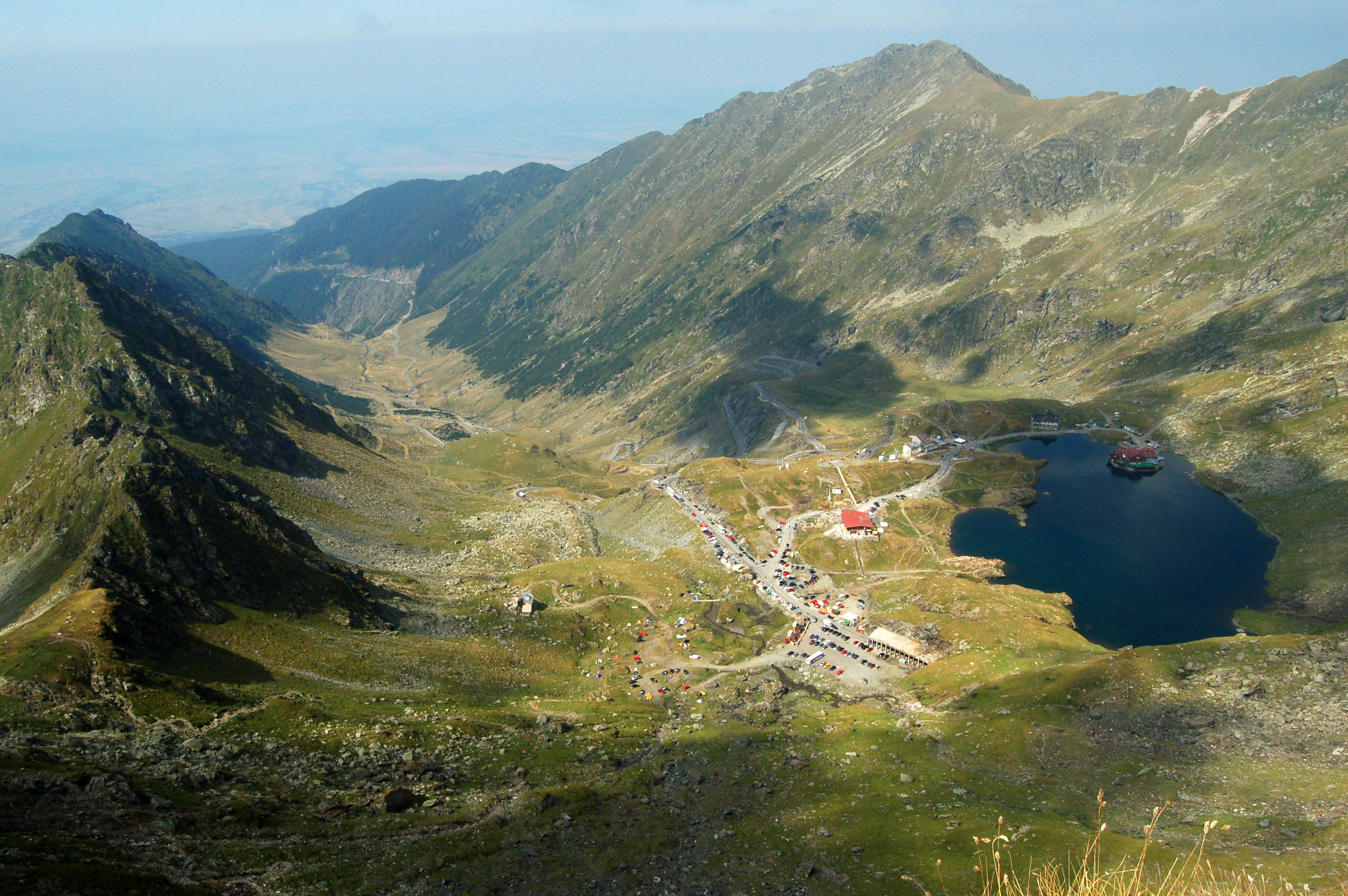
Lake Bâlea

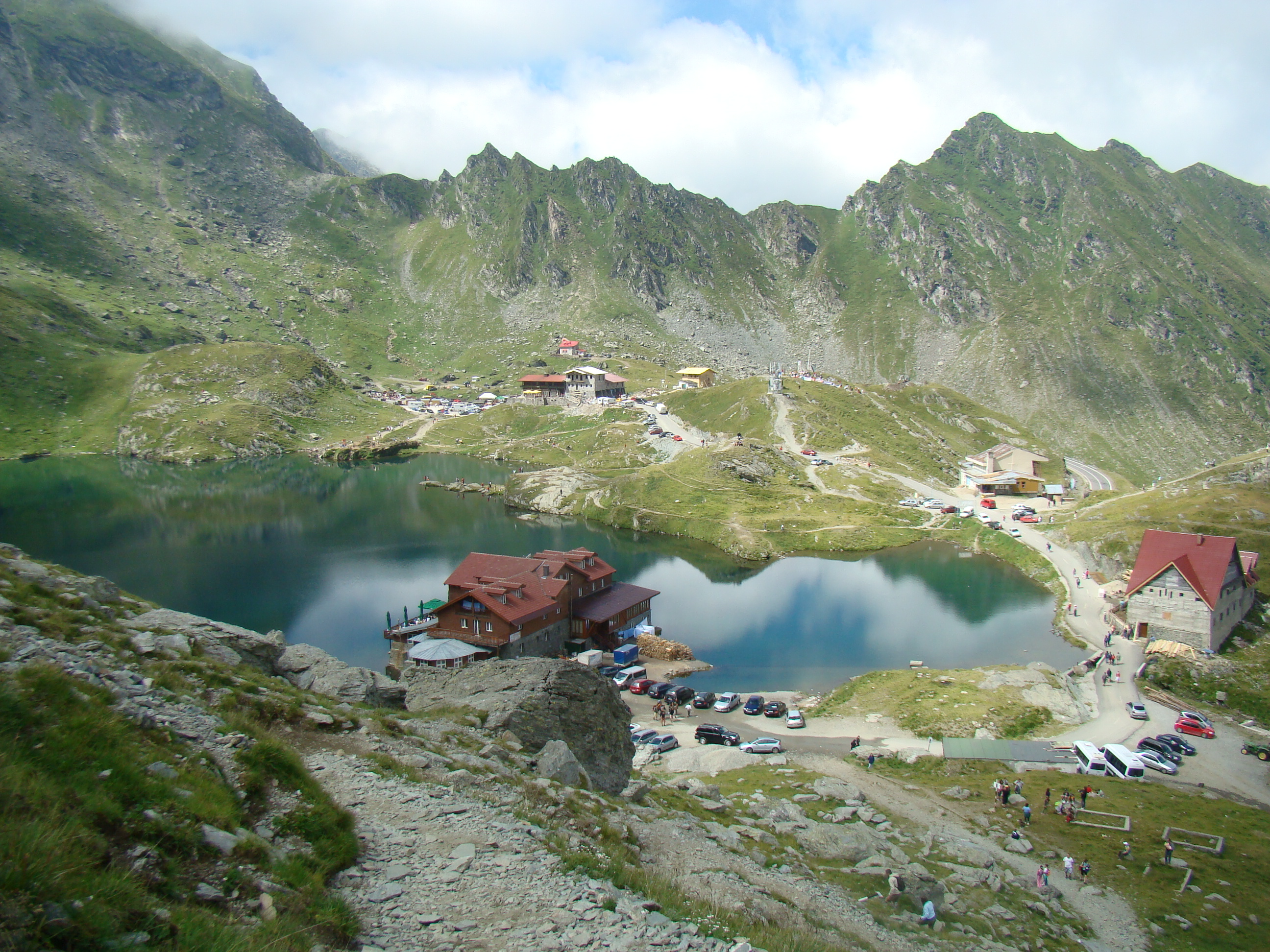
Bâlea lodge

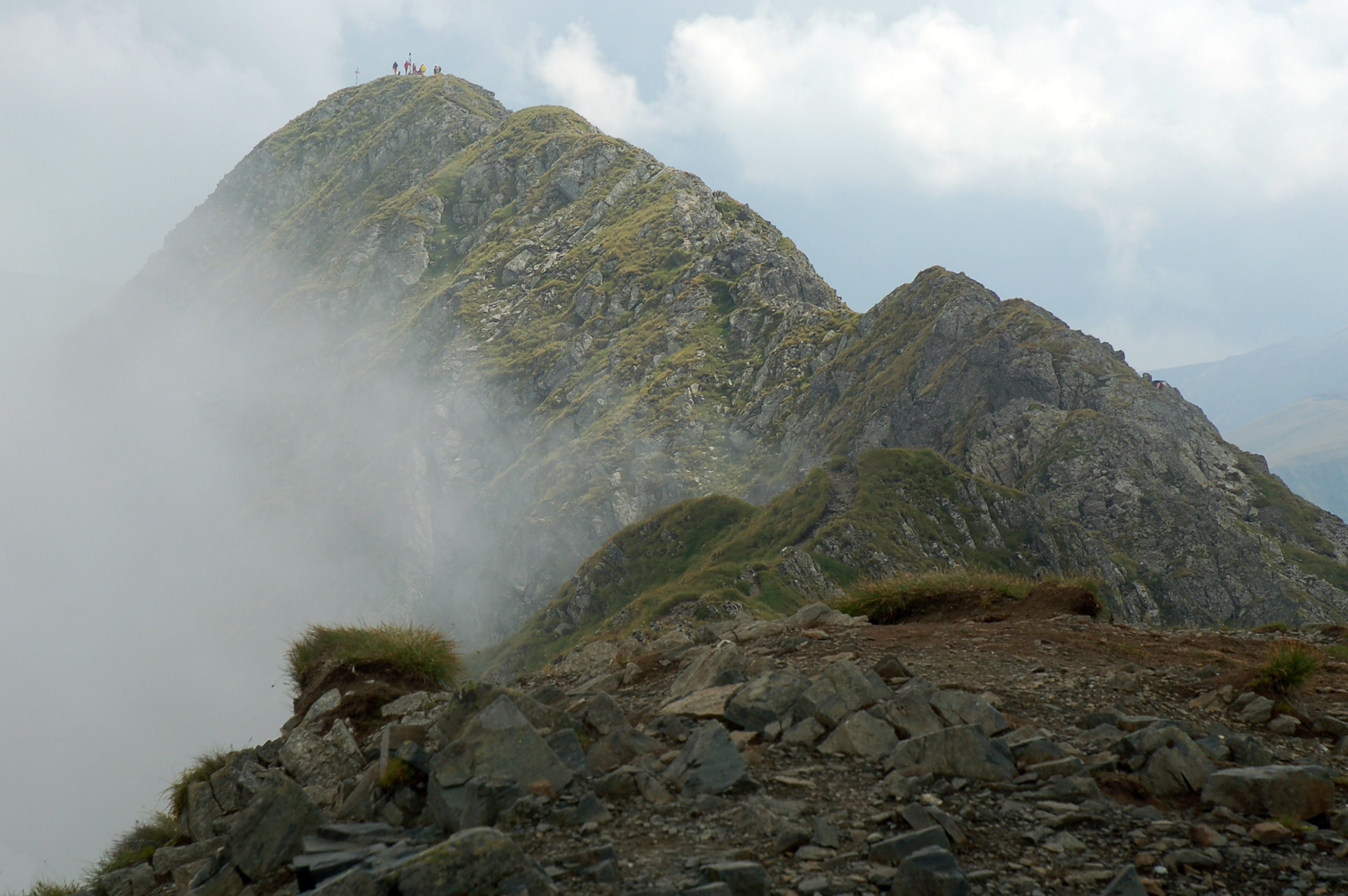
Moldoveanu from Viștea Mare peak

Făgăraș Mountains - from above 2000m, towards Moldoveanu Peak (furthest in the image)

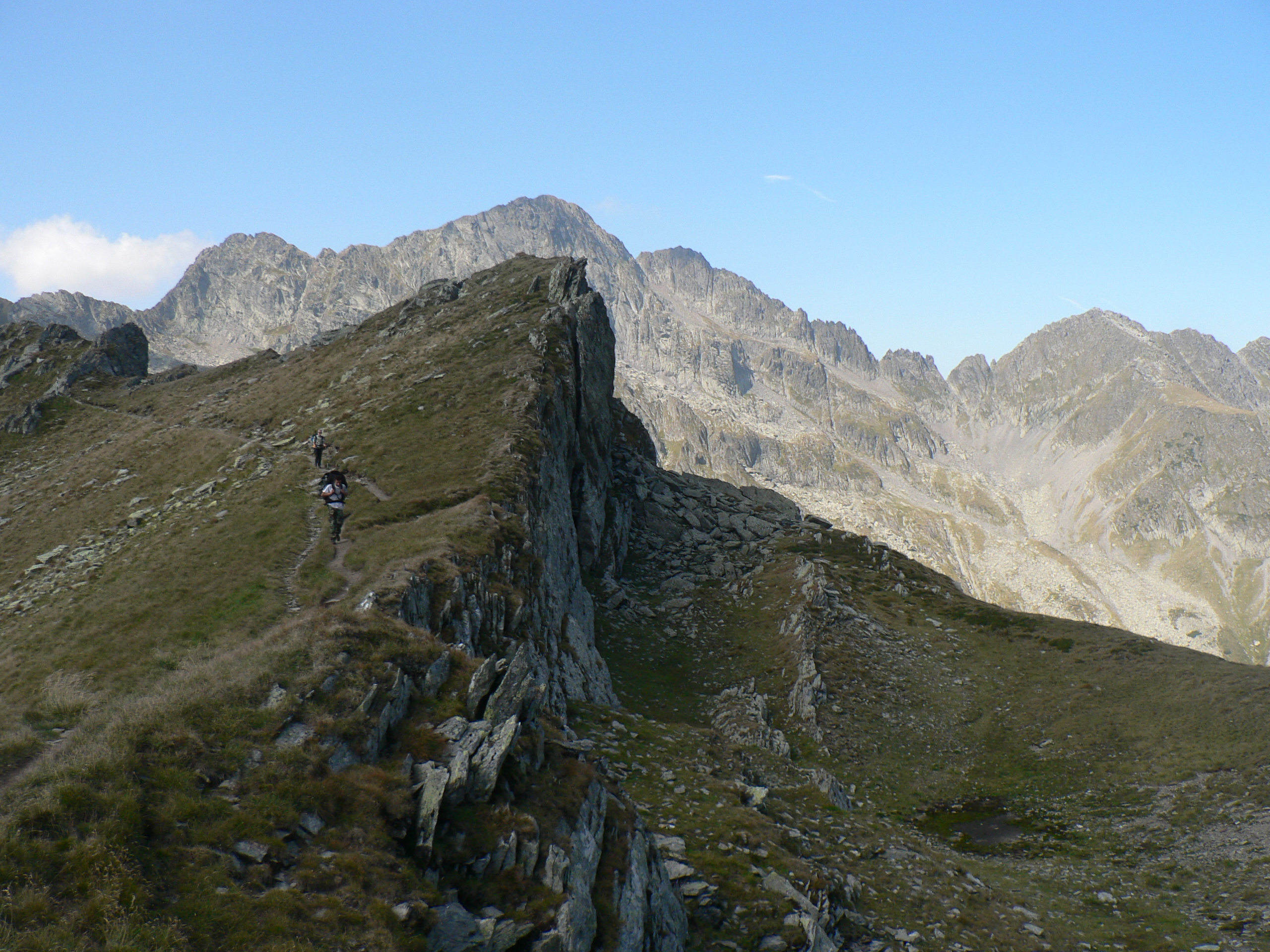
Hiking in Făgăraș Mountains

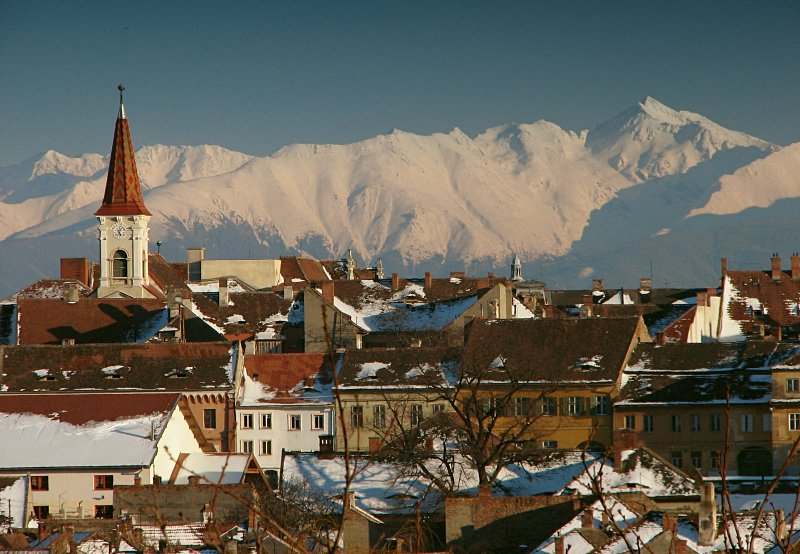
Făgăraș as seen from Sibiu

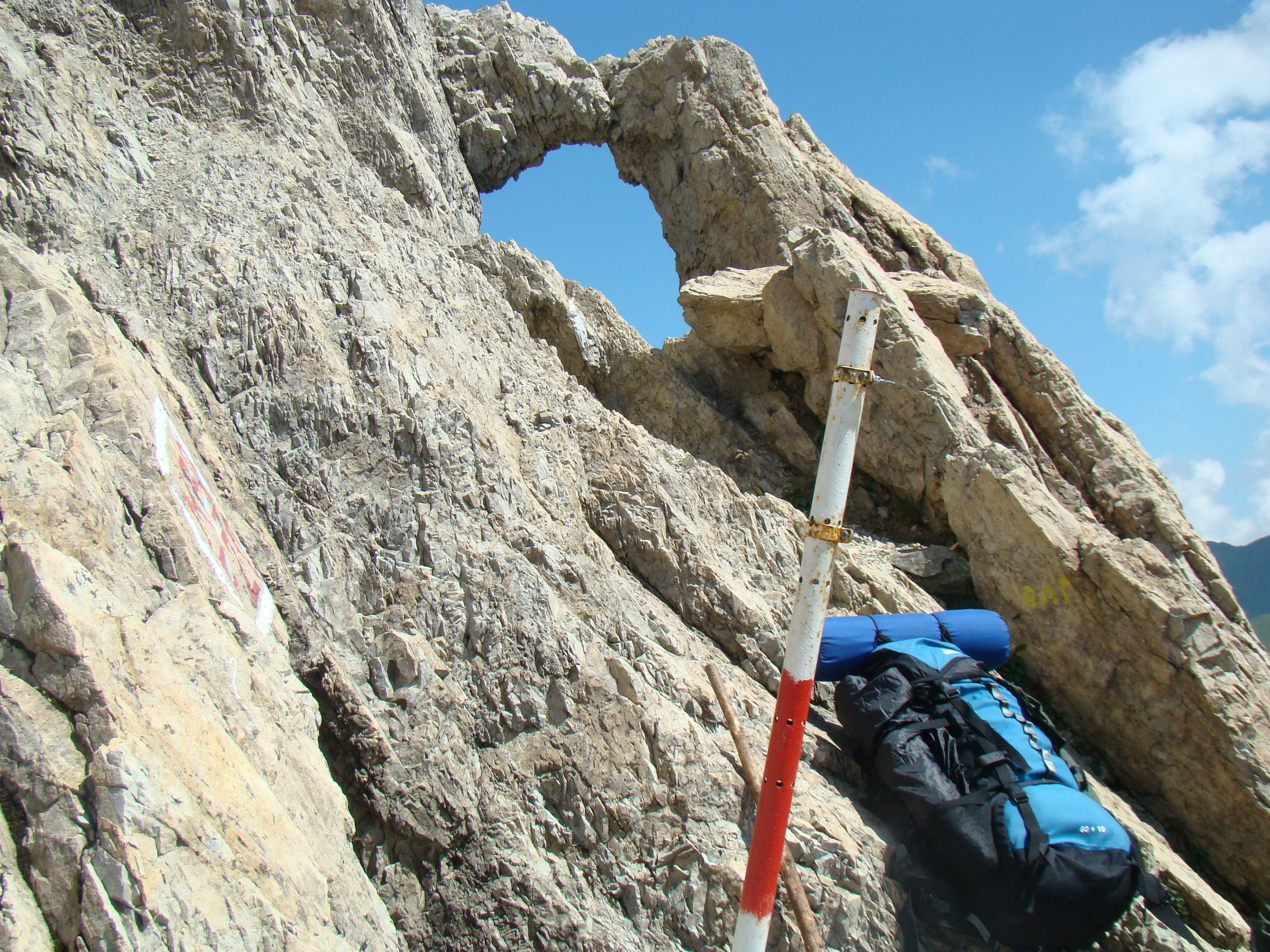
Fereastra Zmeilor rock formations

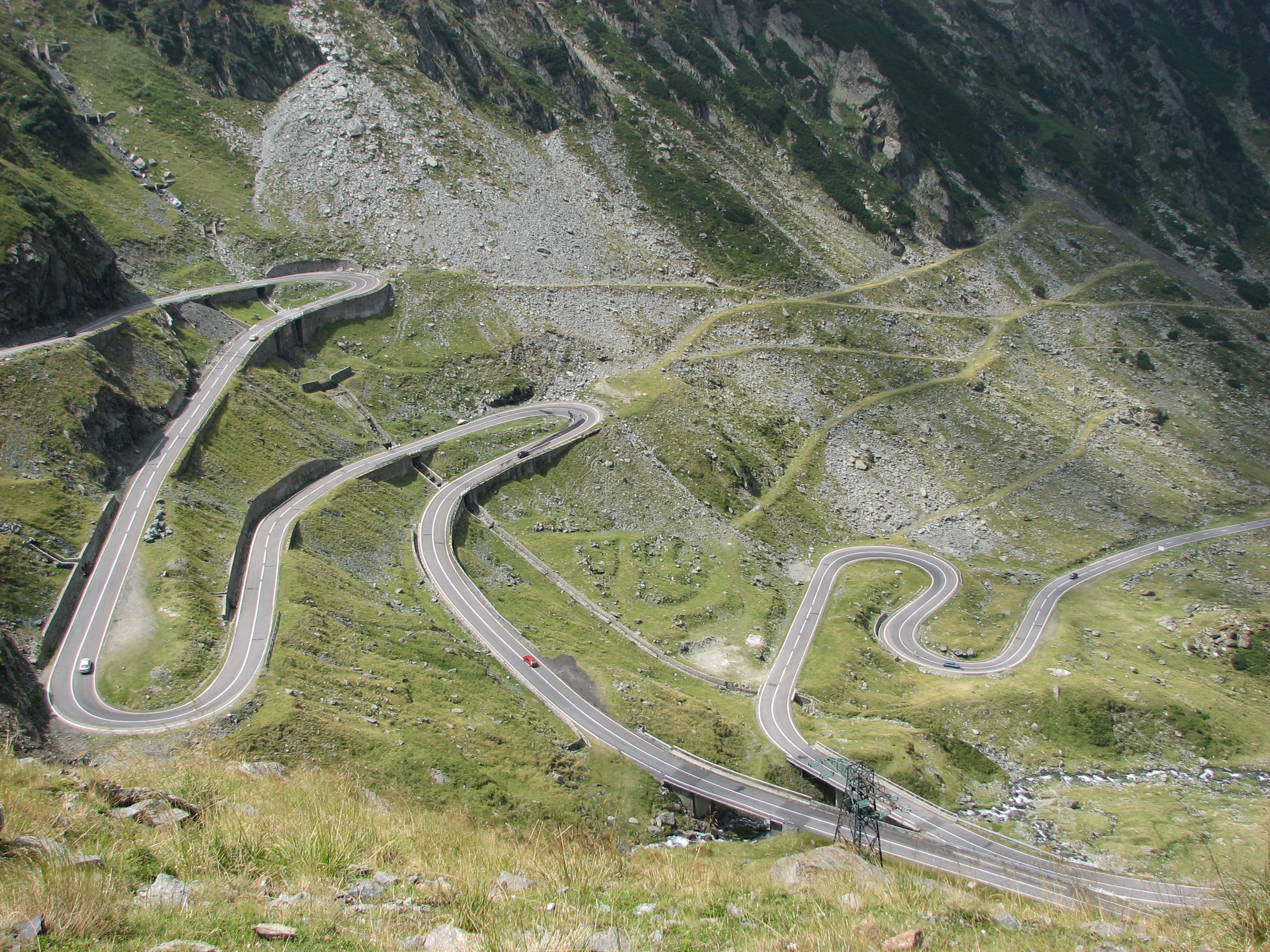
Bâlea Valley

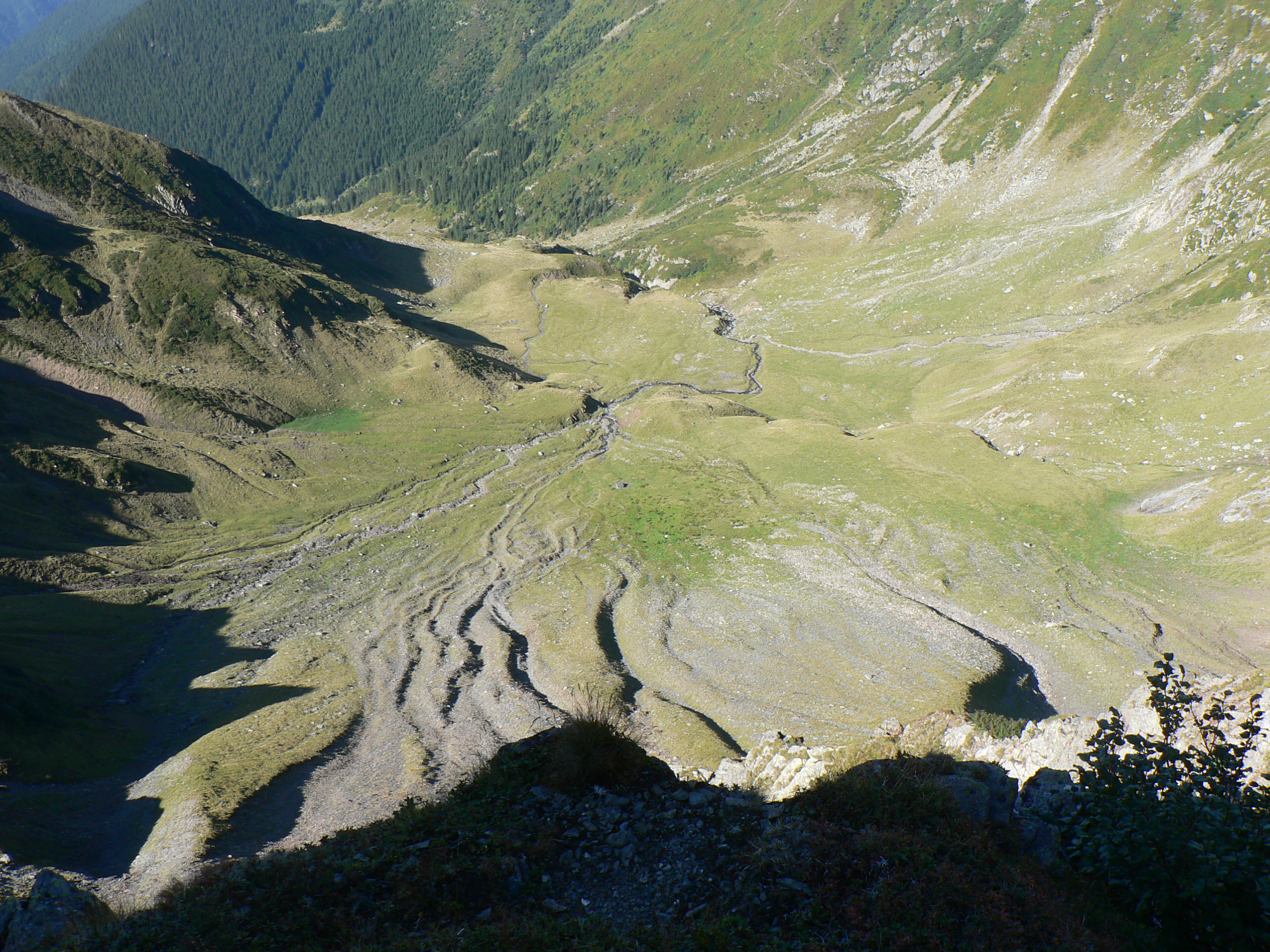
View towards a glacial valley

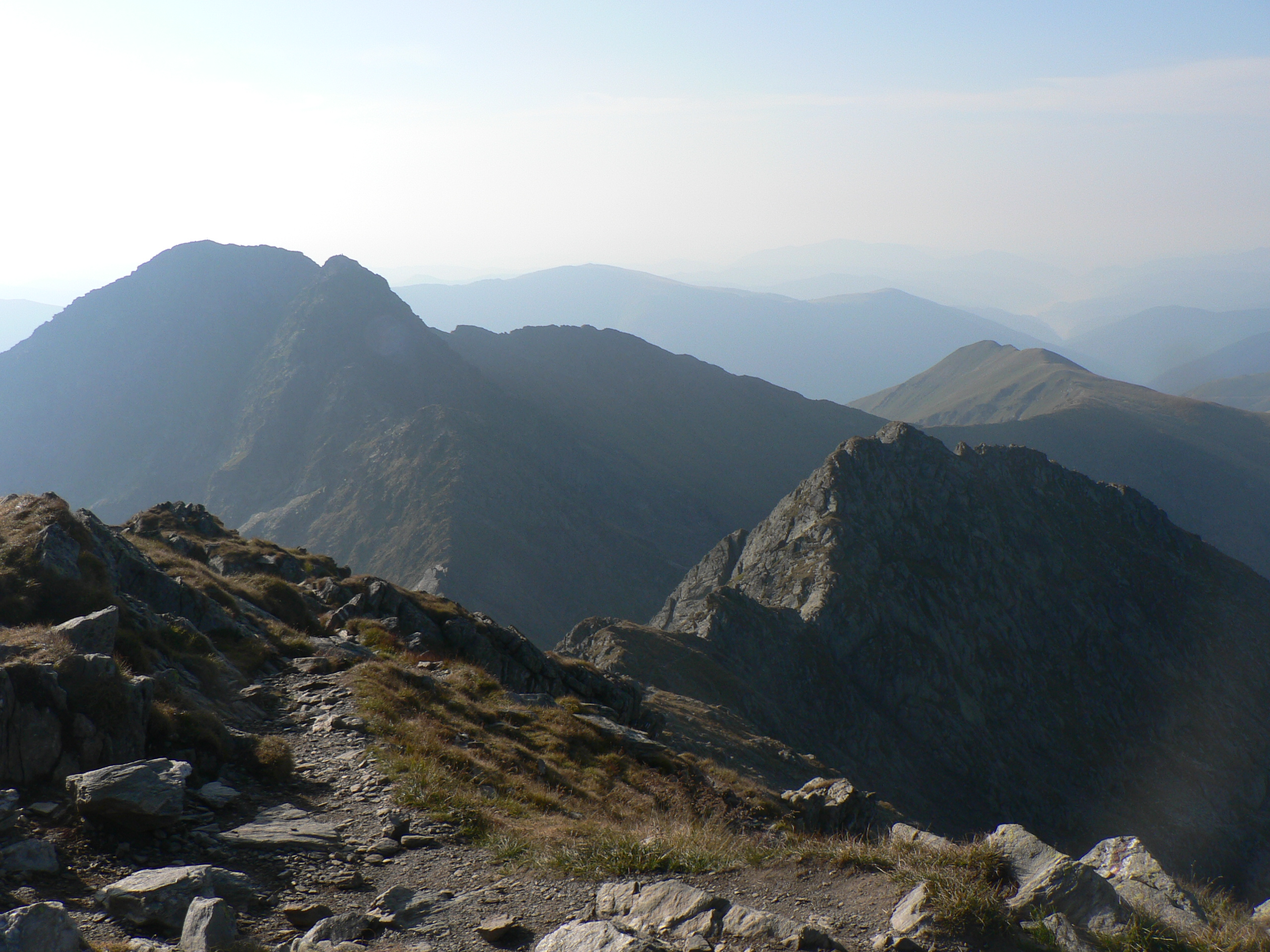
Mountain crests

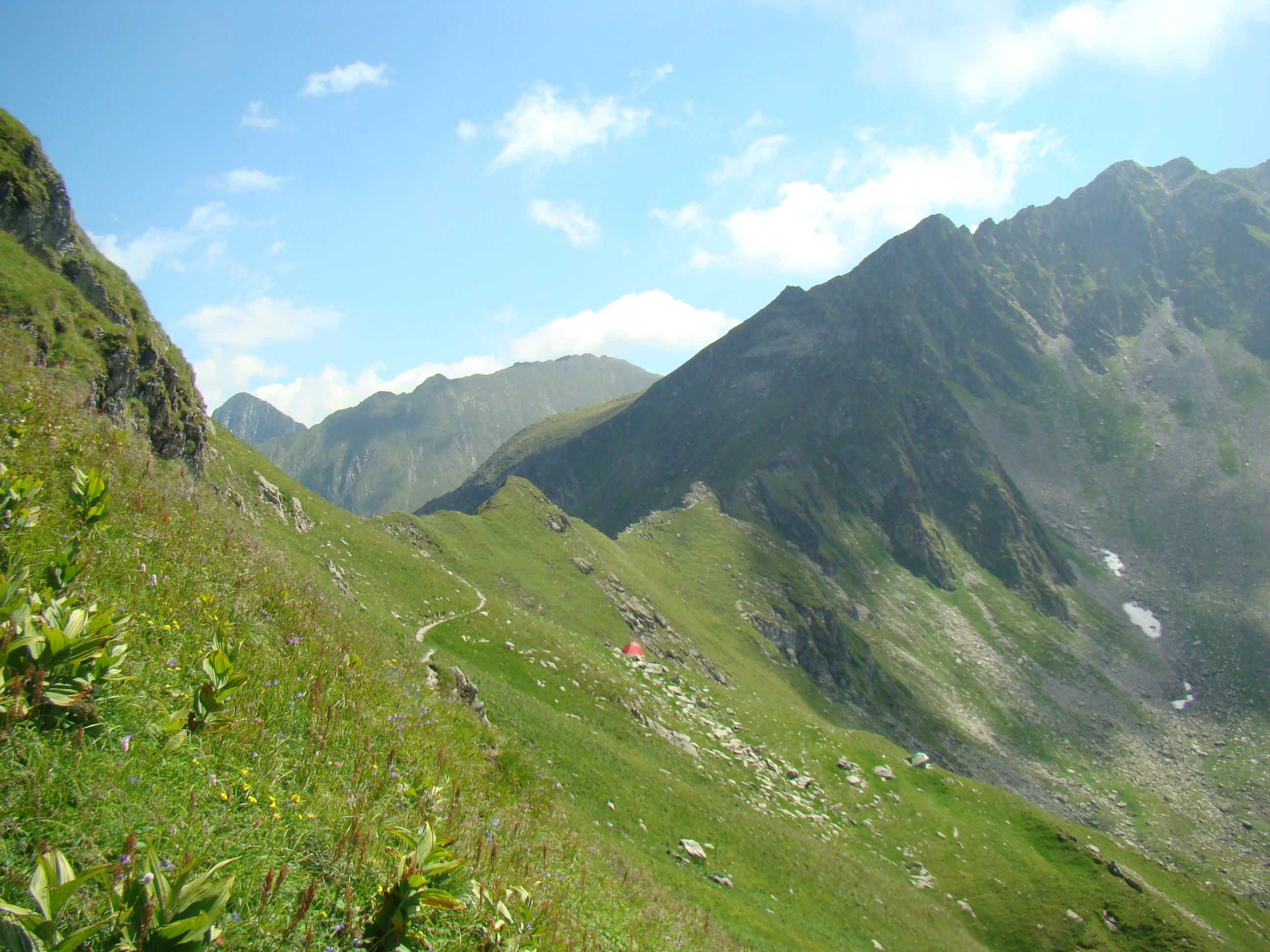
On the trail to Portiţa Arpaşului

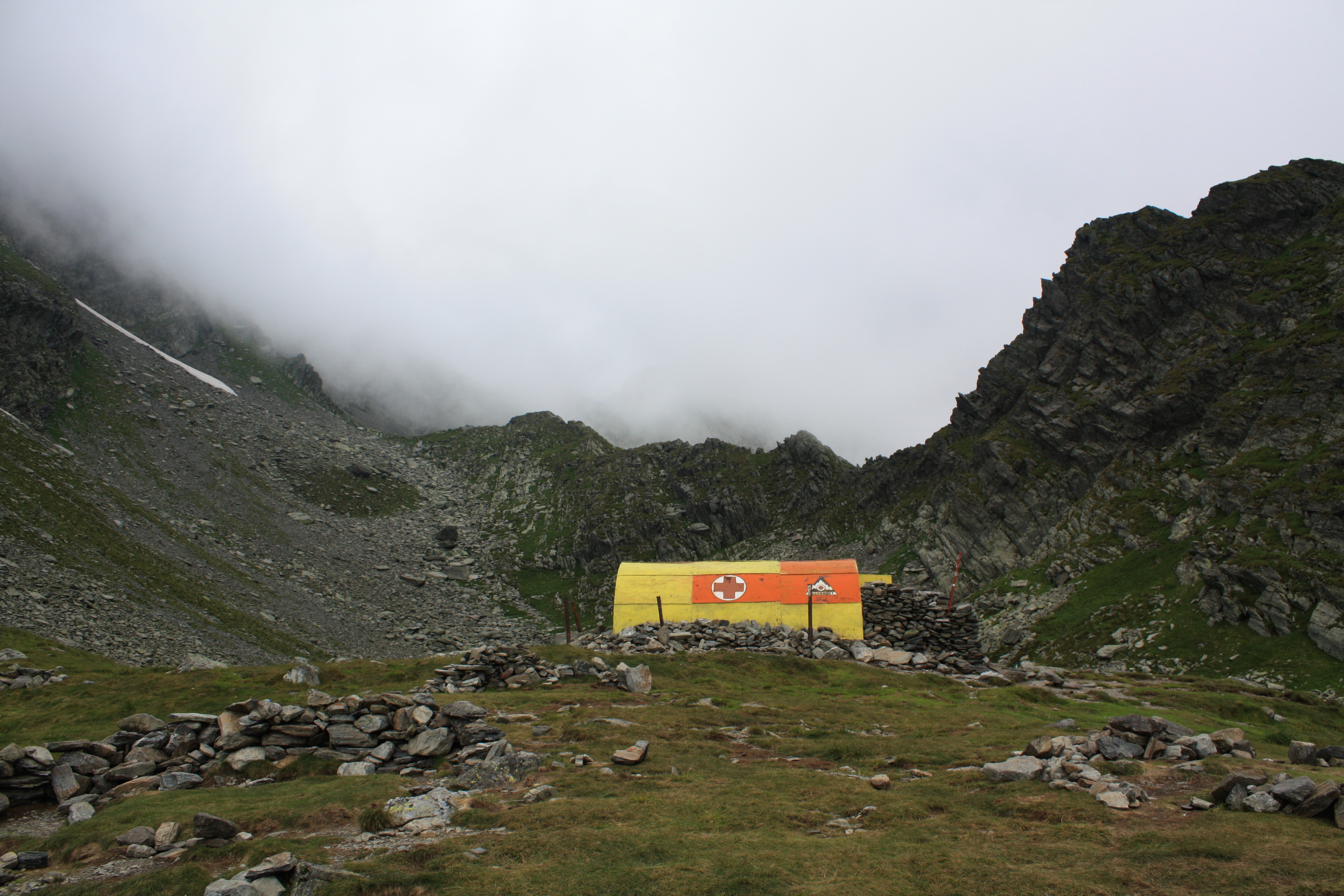
Călțun refuge

=== External links ===
- Făgăraș Mountains: Trails, Webcam, Chalets, Cable car, Ski slopes, Transfăgărașan, Maps, Alpine Lakes Dam and Lake Vidraru
- Pictures and landscapes from the Fagaras Mountains
- Website about the Carpathian Mountains
- SummitPost Page for Făgăraș
- From Sâmbăta to Viștea refuge in winter
- From Capra to Podragu and Moldoveanu peak in summer
- Piscu Câinelui area in winter
- Fereastra Zmeilor refuge in winter
- Călțun and Scara in winter
- Photos from 25+ trips in the Făgăraș range
- (in Romanian and English) Salvamont Victoria
- Făgăraș Interactive map
