= Moldoveanu Peak =

Mountain peak in the Southern Carpathians and the highest point of Romania

Vârful Moldoveanu
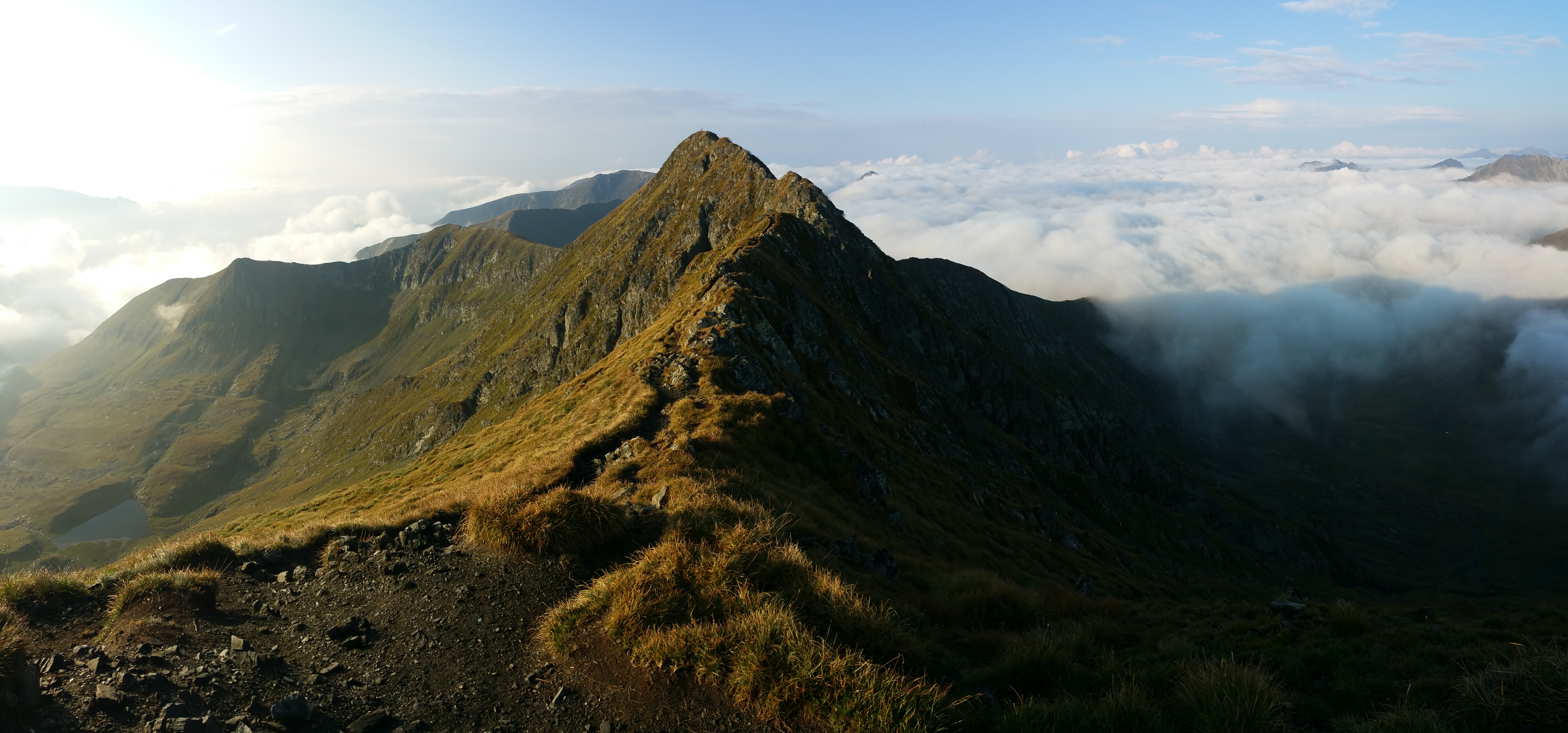
- Moldoveanu seen from the peak of Viștea

Highest point
- Elevation: 2,545 m (8,350 ft)
- Prominence: 2,046 m (6,713 ft)
- Listing: Country high point Ultra
- Coordinates: 45°36′00″N 24°44′16″E

Geography
- Location within Romania
- Location: Argeș County, Romania
- Parent range: Făgăraș Mountains, Southern Carpathians

Climbing
- Easiest route: Scramble

Moldoveanu Peak (Romanian: Vârful Moldoveanu, pronounced [ˈvɨrful moldoˈve̯anu]; "Moldavian Peak"), at 2,545 metres (8,350 ft), is the highest mountain peak in Romania. It is located in Argeș County, in the Făgăraș Mountains of the Southern Carpathians.

The most popular routes to reach Moldoveanu are over the Viștea Mare (2,527 metres (8,291 ft)), by paths coming from Podragu, Sâmbăta, or by the Viștea Valley.

The closest settlement on the north side is Victoria and on the south side Câmpulung.

In December 2019, the star XO-1, located 536 light-years away in the constellation Corona Borealis, was named Moldoveanu after the mountain.

== Ascent ==
Moldoveanu can be climbed over the Viștea Mare (2,527 metres (8,291 ft)), by paths coming from Podragu, Sâmbăta, or by the Viștea Valley.

== See also ==
- List of European ultra prominent peaks
