= Leaota River =

Leaota River may refer to:

- Leaota, another name for the upper course of the Raciu in Dâmbovița County, Romania
- Leaota, a tributary of the Zârna in Argeș County, Romania

== See also ==
- Leaota Mountains, Romania
