= Lajos Petrik =

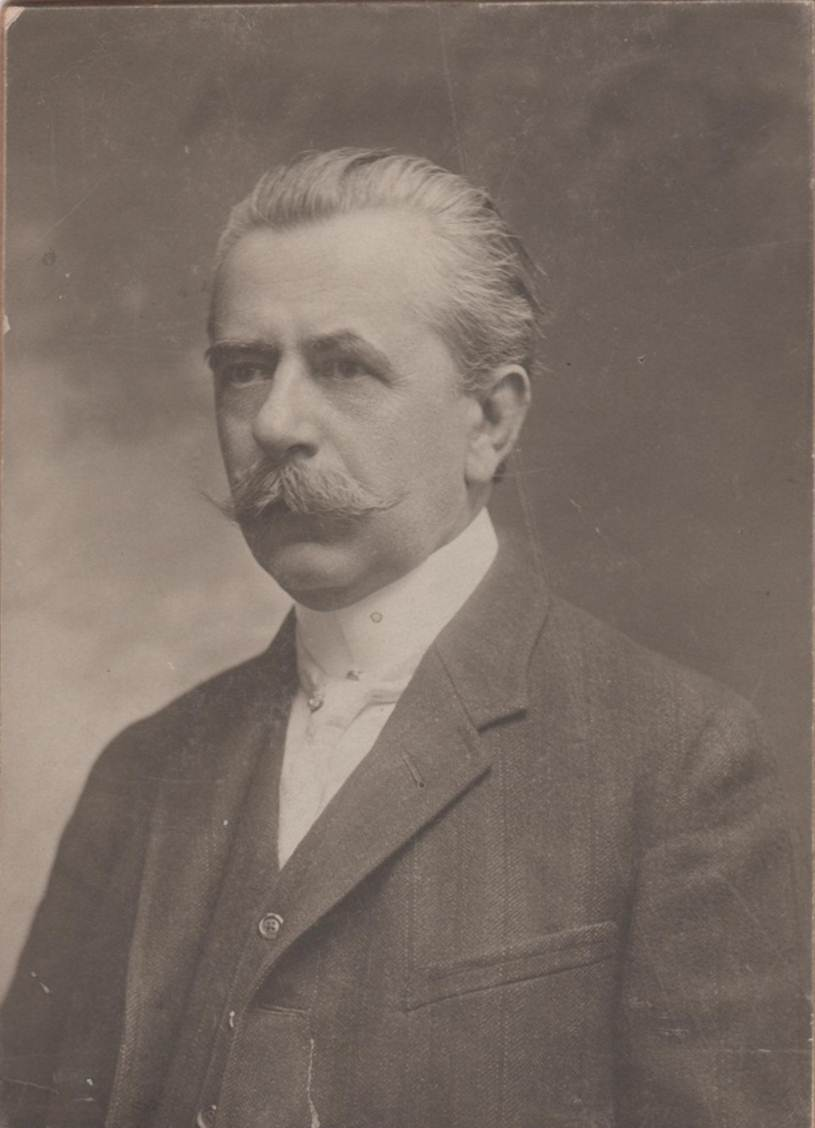
- Born: 5 December 1851; Sopron, Kingdom of Hungary
- Died: 7 June 1932 (aged 80); Budapest, Kingdom of Hungary
- Resting place: Kerepesi Cemetery
- Occupations: Chemist, ceramist and teacher
- Spouse: Franciska Fischer

Signature
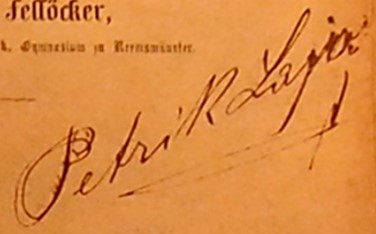

Lajos Petrik (German: Ludwig von Petrik; 5 December 1851 – 7 June 1932) was a Hungarian chemist, ceramist and teacher of inorganic chemical technology in Hungarian Royal Public Secondary Industrial School and the predecessor of today's Petrik Lajos Bilingual Vocational School of Chemistry, Environmental Protection and Information Technology. Later in his career, he was the principal of that school.

== Biography ==
Lajos Petrik was born in Sopron, Hungary as the second child of József Petrik and Amalia Krueg. After he had completed his secondary education in Sopron and Pozsony, he studied at the University of Technology in Graz. There he got a job as a teacher of the fundamentals of chemical technology between 1874 and 1879. In 1880 he was asked by Ágoston Trefort, Minister of Religion and Public Education, to teach in the recently established Public Secondary Industrial School of Budapest. From 1907 to 1914, he was the director of the institution.

He started doing research about the compounds of ceramics and minerals usable in different industries. His scientific articles were published in the journals of the Hungarian Geological Society as well as in other domestical and foreign trade magazines (e.g. Zentralblatt). He also wrote notes for the two biggest Hungarian encyclopedias (Pallas's Great Lexicon and Révai's Great Lexicon) on the subject of minerals, inorganic chemical compounds and the history of ceramics.

In 1891 he became a member of the Association of Hungarian Tourists (Hungarian: Magyar Turista Egyesület, MTE) that published a famous monthly printed newspaper called the Journal of Tourists (Hungarian: Turisták Lapja). Until 1910 he was an editor of the journal. During this period he climbed many of the peaks in the Pannonian Basin. He was an active climber in the Southern Carpathians, in the Alps and also in the Făgăraș Mountains. He usually wrote notes about the trips which were also published along with his amateur panoramic photos.

He died on 7 June 1932 in Budapest. His grave can be found in the Kerepesi Cemetery (Budapest).

== Professional works ==
In addition to his general knowledge of chemistry, Petrik specialized in the field of silicate chemistry. In this field, he conducted experiments and published articles. Many scientists throughout Europe visited him to seek out his expertise. The German newspaper Zentralblatt published his articles during his lifetime. Owing to Petrik's reputation, Hungarian delegations were always welcomed guests in different professional exhibitions (e.g. World Exhibition). His first article was written with the co-operation of geologist János Jakab Mattyasovszky. The title of this work is: The detailed catalog of Hungarian raw materials for the industry of materials, glasses, cement and mineral paints. It was published in 1885. In this book they described the properties of samples (minerals) coming from 176 different places in Hungary.

== Awards ==
- Military Merit Medal (Austria-Hungary)
- Order of the Cross of Takovo (4th Class)
- Crowned Gold Cross of Merit (1896)
- Title of Royal Councilor (1911)
- Order of Franz Joseph - Officer's Cross (1915)

== In memoriam ==
- A peak of Tatra Mountains was named after him (now it is Sokolia veža)
- Petrik Lajos Bilingual Vocational School of Chemistry, Environmental Protection and Information Technology in Budapest bears his name.

== Sources (in Hungarian) ==
- Déry József: Petrik Lajos (Turisták Lapja, 1927. 7-8. szám)
- Jász Géza: Petrik Lajos (Turisták Lapja, 1932. 7-8. szám)
- Grofcsik János: Petrik Lajos (Építőanyag, 1963. 2–3. szám)
- Hiller István: Nemzeti bibliográfiánk megteremtőjének és családjának soproni kapcsolatai (Soproni Szemle, 1966. 4. szám)
- Dr. Grofcsik János, Dr. Richard Ernő: A magyar finomkerámiaipar története (Műszaki Könyvkiadó, 1973)
- Zsolnay Teréz és Margit, Sikota Győző: Zsolnay (Corvina Könyvkiadó, 1974)
- Dr. Polgárdy Géza: Petrik Lajos hegymászó és turista, aki szerkesztő és fényképész is volt (Magyar Turista, 2015. 12. szám)
- Kistarcsai Kalendárium 2016 (published by Kistarcsa Cultural Association)
- http://epa.oszk.hu/01900/01977/00074/pdf/EPA01977_Soproni_Szemle_1966-xx-4.pdf
- http://adatbazisokonline.hu/en/adatbazis/minisztertanacsi-jegyzokonyvek-1867-1944/adatlap/59228
- https://www.mfgi.hu/sites/default/files/files/M%C3%81FI_Alkalmi_Kiadv%C3%A1nyok%281%29.pdf
- http://dokutar.omikk.bme.hu/collections/mee/fajlok/1891-566-570.pdf
- http://epa.oszk.hu/01000/01059/00006/pdf/1898_6_7_293-295.pdf
- 68. Petrik-csúcs. www.fsz.bme.hu.http://www.fsz.bme.hu/mtsz/mhk/egyeb/k85/68.htm
