= Valea Brădetului River =

Valea Brădetului River may refer to:

- Valea Brădetului, a tributary of the Raciu in Romania
- Valea Brădetului, a tributary of the Vărbilău in Romania
