= Hungarian Royal Public Secondary Industrial School =

Location
- 4 Főherceg Sándor Square; Budapest; Hungary

Information
- Type: industrial secondary school
- Established: 1 December 1879
- Closed: 1947 (continued by three successor institutions)
- Principal: Károly Hegedűs
- Faculty: chemistry, architecture, engineering

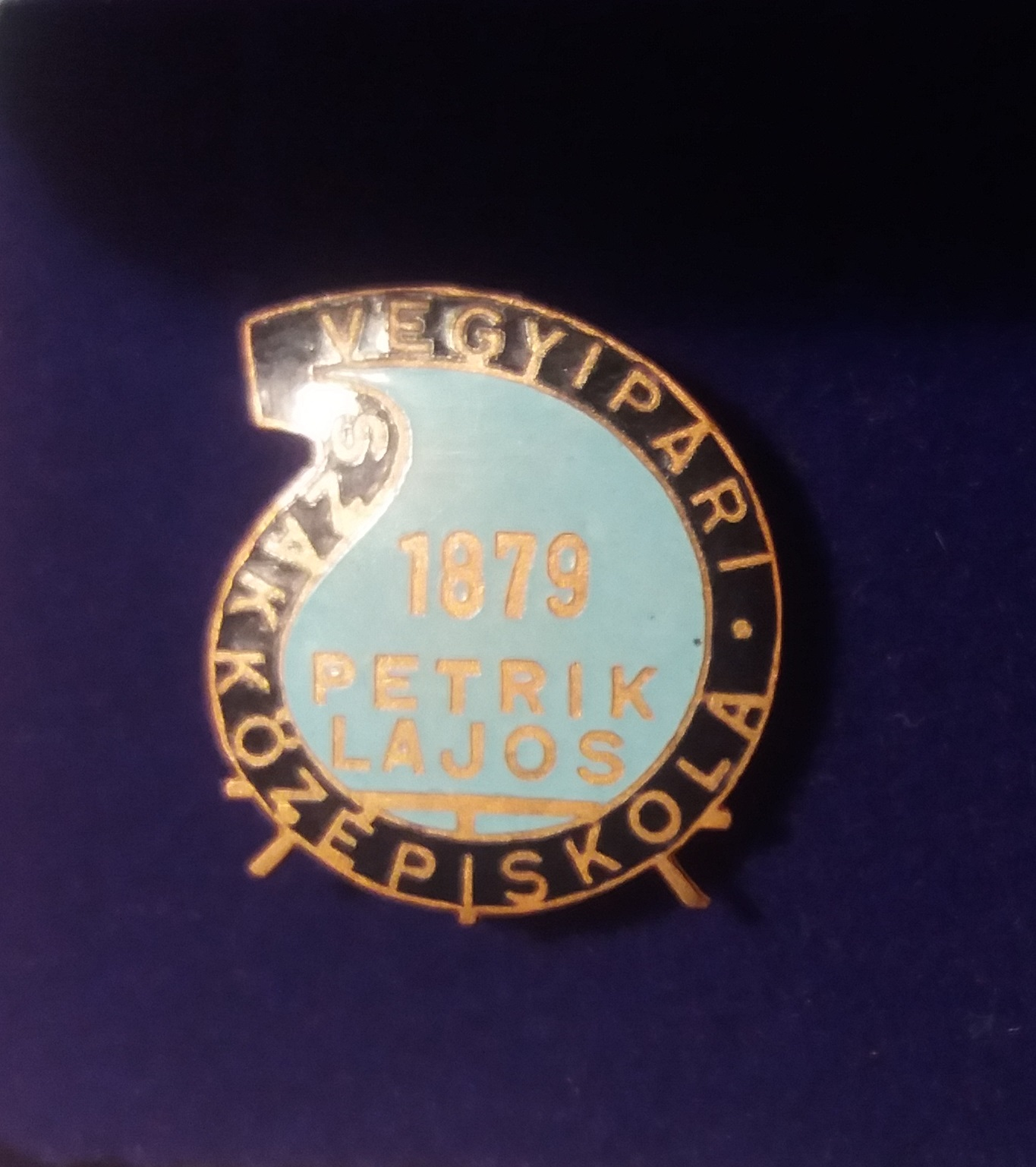
Hungarian Royal Public Secondary Industrial School

Hungarian Royal Public Secondary Industrial School (Hungarian: Állami Középipartanoda) was established by Ágoston Trefort, Minister of Education, on 1 December 1879. The institution trained students to be chemists, machinists and architects.

== Antecedent ==
The political and economical consolidation of Austro-Hungarian Compromise of 1867 made different industries develop faster and urged the inflow of western capital for the investments in railways, shipping and the mining industry. Machinery manufacturing, sugar, alcohol and textile industries developed quickly. It was necessary to create an educational background for these fields. József Eötvös, Ministry of Education in Batthyány government, recognised the importance of this plan and encouraged the founding of an industrial school. It was completed by Trefort.

== Establishment ==
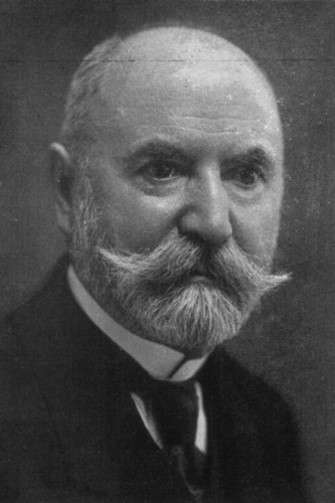
Károly Hegedűs, headmaster for 35 years

The institution was established on 1 December 1879 and officially opened six days later. The official form of the school was ratificated according to the Ministerial Decree No. 16352 in 1880. Curriculums were formed by the requirement of the various industries. The three main professions were chemistry, engineering and architecture. The original building is located in 4 Főherceg Sándor Square (renamed to Gutenberg Square) in Budapest.

Károly Hegedűs, the first principal, defined practices to be the most important part of their courses. He employed teachers such as Lajos Petrik, Gyula Jalsoviczky, Gusztáv Klemp and Károly Gaul, who were well-known in their profession and were knowledgeable about their occupations both in theory and in practice. In addition, they published information on their achievements frequently.

== Reorganization ==
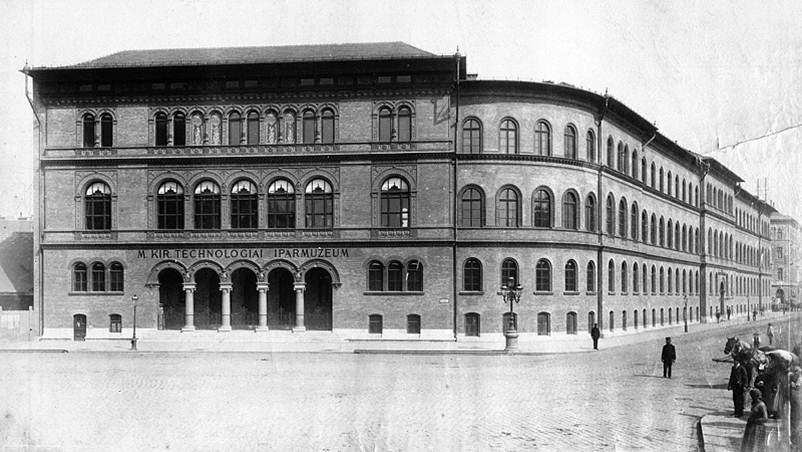
The Hungarian Royal Public Higher Industrial School

In 1881 Trefort set up a committee in order to organise the building of a new institution called the Technological Industry Museum. It was built at 9 Kerepesi Street (formerly Beleznay Garden). The Museum opened on 14 July 1883, involving one of the biggest professional library of Hungary.

After the School reached great successes, Trefort thought that it would be useful if these two institutions worked together. He entrusted Alajos Hauszmann (one of the best known architects of the time) to make a plan for the new common building. The building complex was built in the empty area on the corner of József Avenue and Népszínház Street. The ceremonial opening was on 15 September 1889. The common principal was Károly Hegedűs from 1 July 1884. He led the reorganised institution for 35 years.

== The turn of the century ==
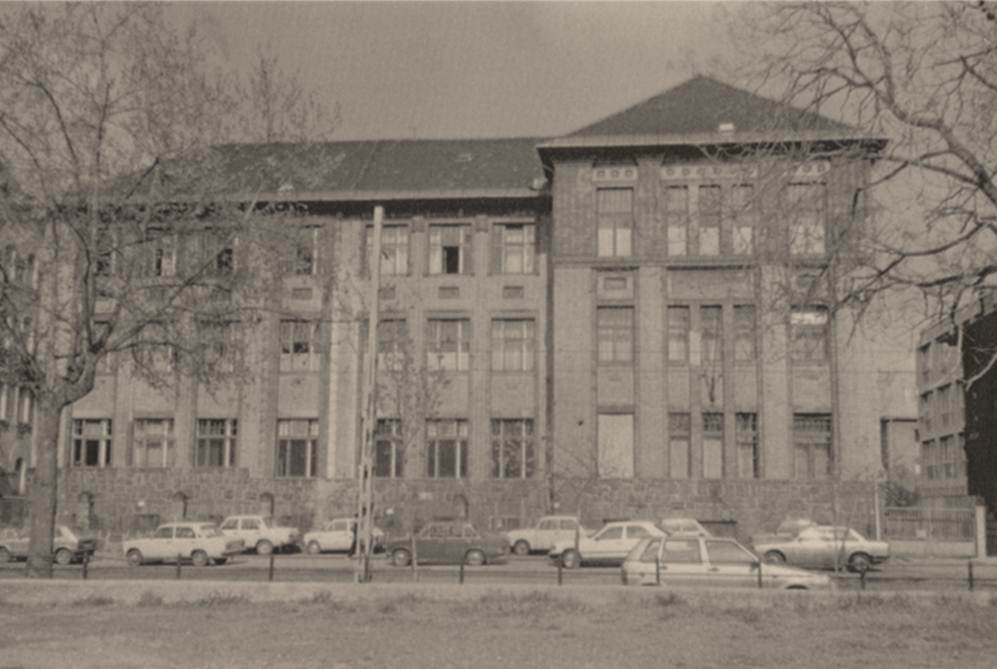
The building of Chemical Secondary School (it was renamed Petrik Lajos Technical School in 1954) - 48 Thököly Street

In 1898 after great successes in the way of education, the School got the marker 'Higher' and was renamed as 'Hungarian Royal Public Higher Industrial School' (Hungarian: Magyar Királyi Állami Felső Ipariskola). The three main courses were complemented with courses related to the metal-iron industry and the timber industry. Due to a large number of students applying, the architecture class separated out in the same year and in 1902 it was established in a new institution under 74 Thököly Street named Hungarian Royal Public Higher Architectural Industrial School (Hungarian: Magyar Királyi Állami Felső Építő Ipariskola). The interest of chemical classes increased sharply, that is why the leading commission decided to move to a separate building. The temporary location was 19 Vas Street, however after a few years the class moved back to the original building. Finally, in 1940, they moved into their new building located at 48-54 Thököly Street. The name of the school was Chemical Secondary School. The original school was eliminated in this year.

== Successors ==
- 1898: Hungarian Royal Public Higher Architectural Industrial School (today it is Szent István University, Ybl Miklós Faculty of Architecture and Civil Engineering)
- 1940: Chemical Secondary School (today it is Petrik Lajos Bilingual Vocational School of Chemistry, Environmental Protection and Information Technology)
- 1947: Engineering Technical High School (today it is Óbuda University, Donát Bánki Faculty of Mechanical and Safety Engineering)

== Sources (Hungarian) ==
- http://www.omikk.bme.hu/tudtort/29/fejezet-12.html
- http://www.fataj.hu/2010/01/211/Gaul-Karoly_emlekfuzet_A5090902gm.pdf
- http://www.petrik.hu/index.php/hu/hirek/341-petrik-konyv-2016
- Hegedűs Károly: A Budapesti Állami Ipariskola alapításának és működésének rövid története (Pátria, Budapest, 1896.)
- Kistarcsai Kalendárium 2016
- Természet Világa (144. évf. 8. szám)
- Kistarcsai Kalendárium 2016
- 125 év... Petrik Jubileumi Évkönyv
