= Southern Carpathians =

Group of mountain ranges in southern Romania

- Romanian: Carpații Meridionali
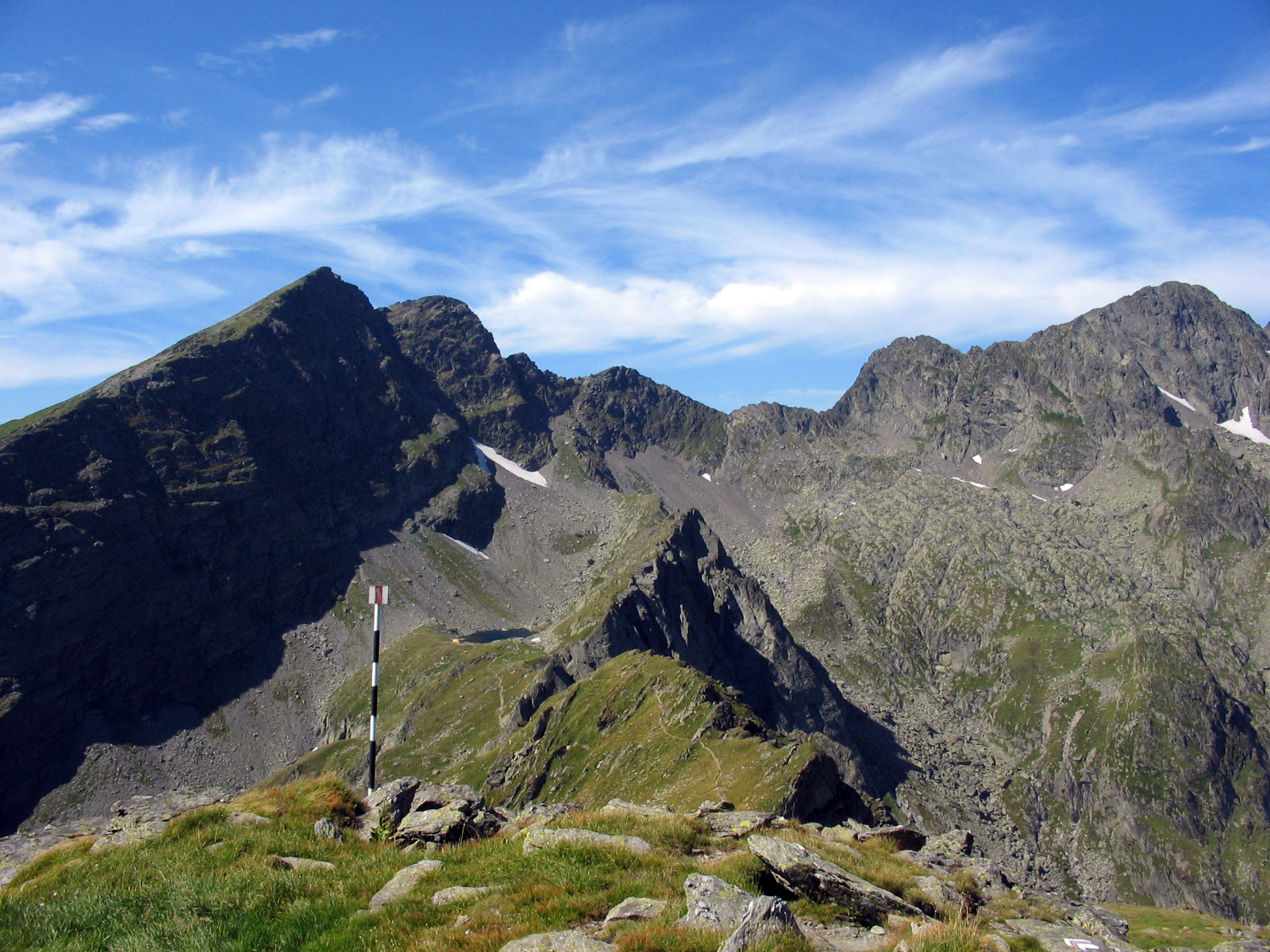
- Negoiu Peak 2,535 metres (8,317 ft)

Highest point
- Peak: Moldoveanu
- Elevation: 2,544 m (8,346 ft)
- Coordinates: 45°30′N 24°15′E

Geography
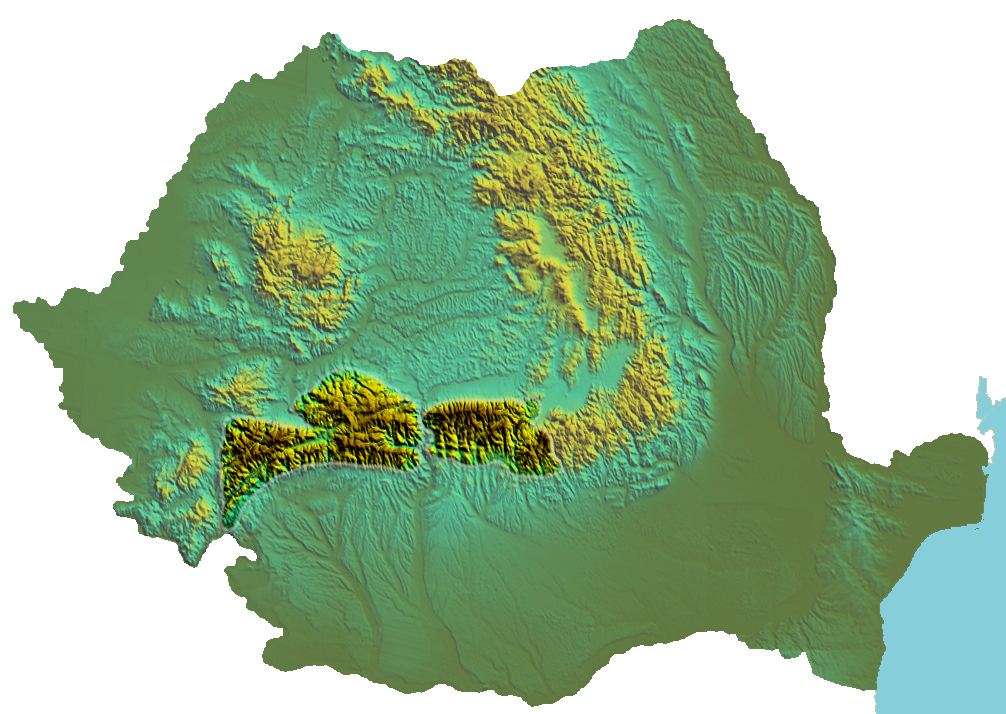
- Location of the Southern Carpathians in Romania
- Country: Romania
- Parent range: Carpathians

Geology
- Orogeny: Alpine orogeny
- Rock age: Mostly Triassic

The Southern Carpathians (also known as the Transylvanian Alps; Romanian: Carpații Meridionali [karˈpatsij ˌmeridi.oˈnalʲ]; Hungarian: Déli-Kárpátok) are a group of mountain ranges located in southern Romania. They cover the part of the Carpathian Mountains located between the Prahova River in the east and the Timiș and Cerna Rivers in the west. To the south they are bounded by the Balkan Mountains in eastern Serbia.

== Heights ==
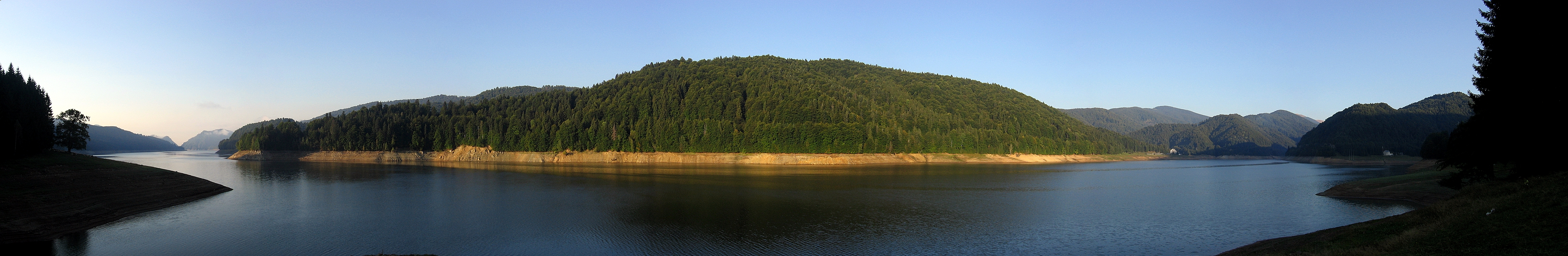
Lake Vidraru in the Făgăraș Mountains

The Southern Carpathians are the second highest group of mountains in the Carpathian Mountain range (after Tatra), reaching heights of over 2,500 meters. Although considerably smaller than the Alps, they are classified as having an alpine landscape. Their high mountain character, combined with great accessibility, makes them popular with tourists and scientists.

The highest peaks are:

- Moldoveanu Peak, 2,544 metres – Făgăraș Mountains
- Negoiu, 2,535 metres – Făgăraș Mountains
- Parângu Mare, 2,519 metres – Parâng Mountains
- Omu Peak 2,514 metres – Bucegi Mountains
- Peleaga, 2,509 metres – Retezat Mountains

Despite the heights, some of the most accessible passages in the Carpathians in Romania are along the rivers, which cross the mountain range (the Olt River) or form wide valleys (along the Prahova River Valley or along the Jiu River Valley).

== Geology ==
The South Carpathians represent an intricate pile of tectonic nappes, overthrusted from west eastwards during the Austrian (Middle Cretaceous) and Laramian paroxysmal phases, corresponding to various plate fragments. The napes are (from west eastwards): the Supragetic, Getic, Severin and Danubian Units. The Getic Nappe was identified by Murgoci (1905), while the general understanding over the Alpine structure of the South Carpathians was later refined by Codarcea (1940), Codarcea et al. (1961), Năstăseanu et al. (1981), Săndulescu (1984), Săndulescu and Dimitrescu (2004), and Mutihac (1990). The first to apply the global tectonics concepts for the Romanian Carpathians were Rădulescu and Săndulescu (1973).

The Supragetic, Getic Nappes as well as the Danubian Units represent units with both a metamorphic basement and a sedimentary cover, while the Severin Nappe includes only a sedimentary sequence. The Getic Nappe and the Danubian Units sediments include a Palaeozoic sequence (Upper Carboniferous, Lower Permian) and a Mesozoic sequence (Lowermost Jurassic – Middle Cretaceous). The Supragetic Nappe comprises mainly metamorphosed rocks (gneisses, micaschists), while the Severin Nappe includes only Upper Jurassic – Lower Cretaceous sediments.

== Mountain ranges ==
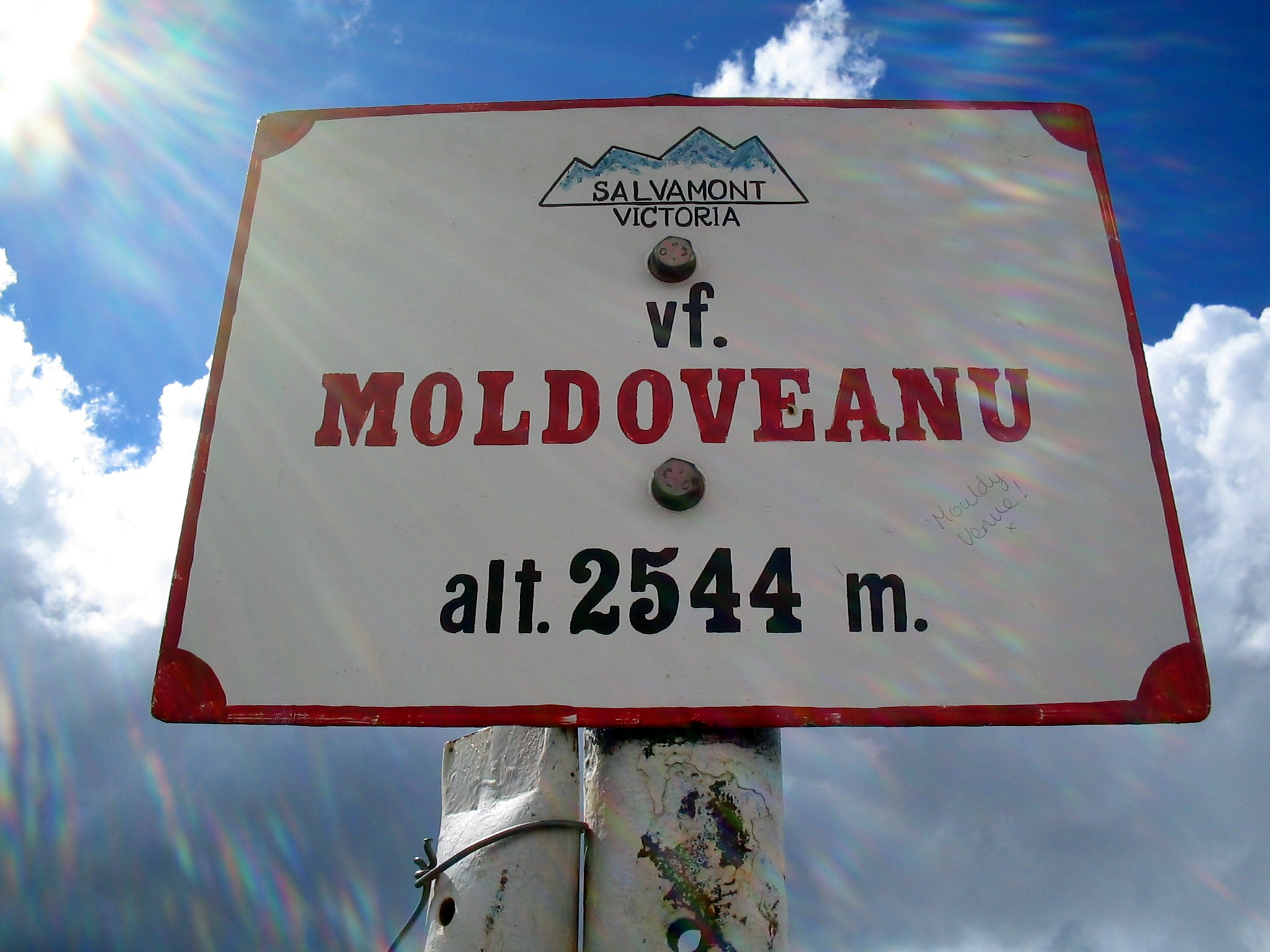
Moldoveanu peak (2544 m) is the highest in Romania and one of the highest peaks of the Carpathians

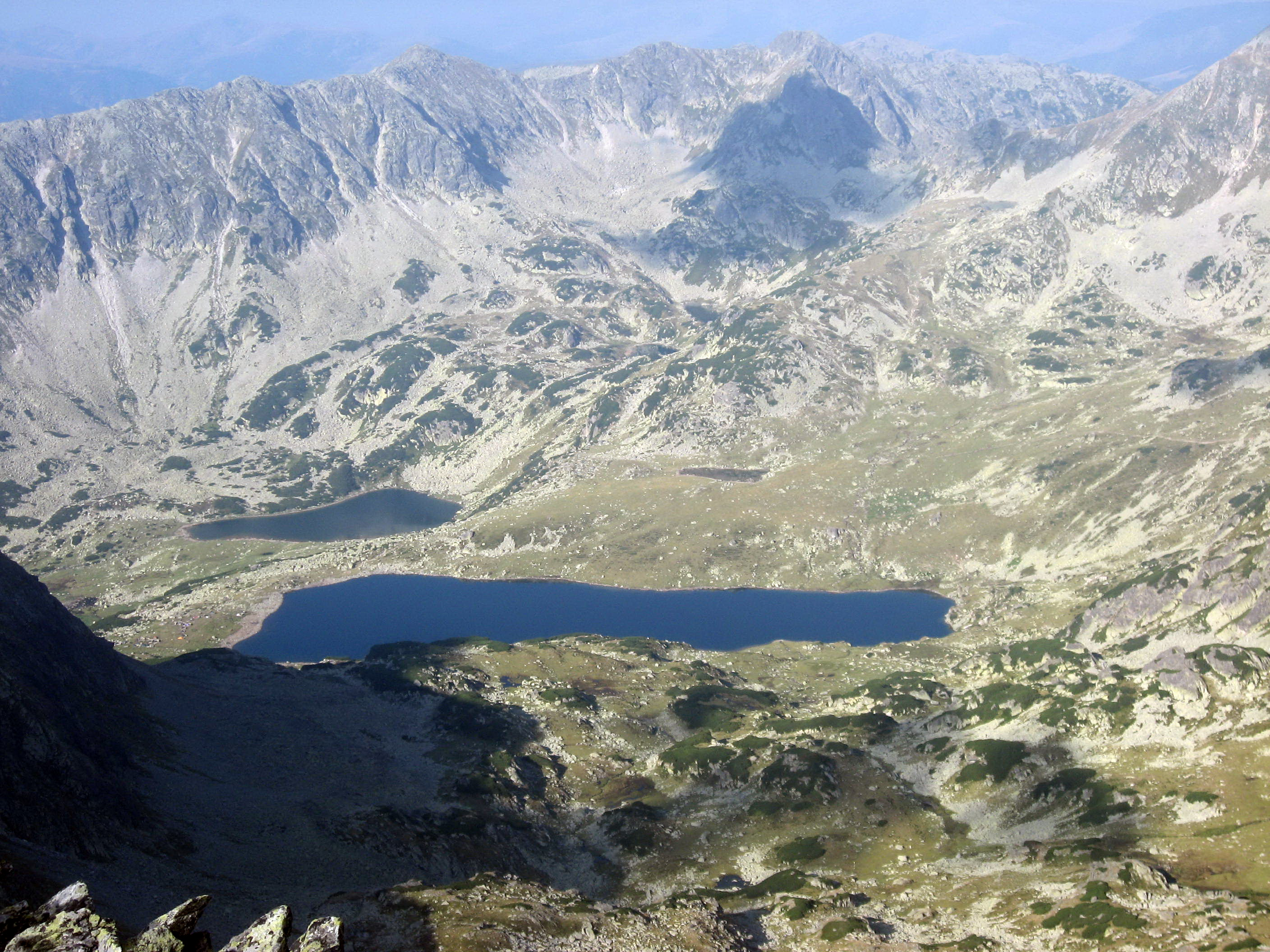
Lake Bucura in the Retezat Mountains

From east to west, four mountain groups can be identified, separated by different river valleys.

- Bucegi Mountains group – between the Prahova and Dâmbovița Rivers.
  - Bucegi Mountains (Munții Bucegi)
  - Piatra Craiului (literally: "Rock of the King")
  - Leaotă Mountains (Munții Leaotă)
- Făgăraș Mountains group – between the Dâmbovița River and the Olt River.
  - Făgăraș Mountains (Munții Făgărașului)
  - Iezer Mountains (Munții Iezer; literally: "Mountains of the Deep Lake")
  - Cozia Mountains (Munții Cozia)
- Parâng Mountains group – between the Olt River and the Jiu River.
  - Parâng Mountains (Munții Parâng)
  - Șureanu Mountains (Munții Șureanu/M. Sebeșului)
  - Cindrel Mountains (Munții Cindrel/M. Cibinului)
  - Lotru Mountains (Munții Lotrului; literally: "Mountains of the Thief")
  - Căpățână Mountains (Munții Căpățânii; literally: "Mountains of the Skull")
- Retezat-Godeanu Mountains group – between the Jiu River and the Timiș and Cerna Rivers.
  - Retezat Mountains (Munții Retezat; literally: "Hewed Mountains")
  - Godeanu Mountains (Munții Godeanu)
  - Vâlcan Mountains (Munții Vâlcan)
  - Mehedinți Mountains (Munții Mehendinți)
  - Cerna Mountains (Munții Cernei)
  - Țarcu Mountains (Munții Țarcu; literally: "Pen Mountains").
- Poiana Ruscă Mountains

The first two groups are steepest on the North side, and the last two are steepest on the South side.

== Gallery ==
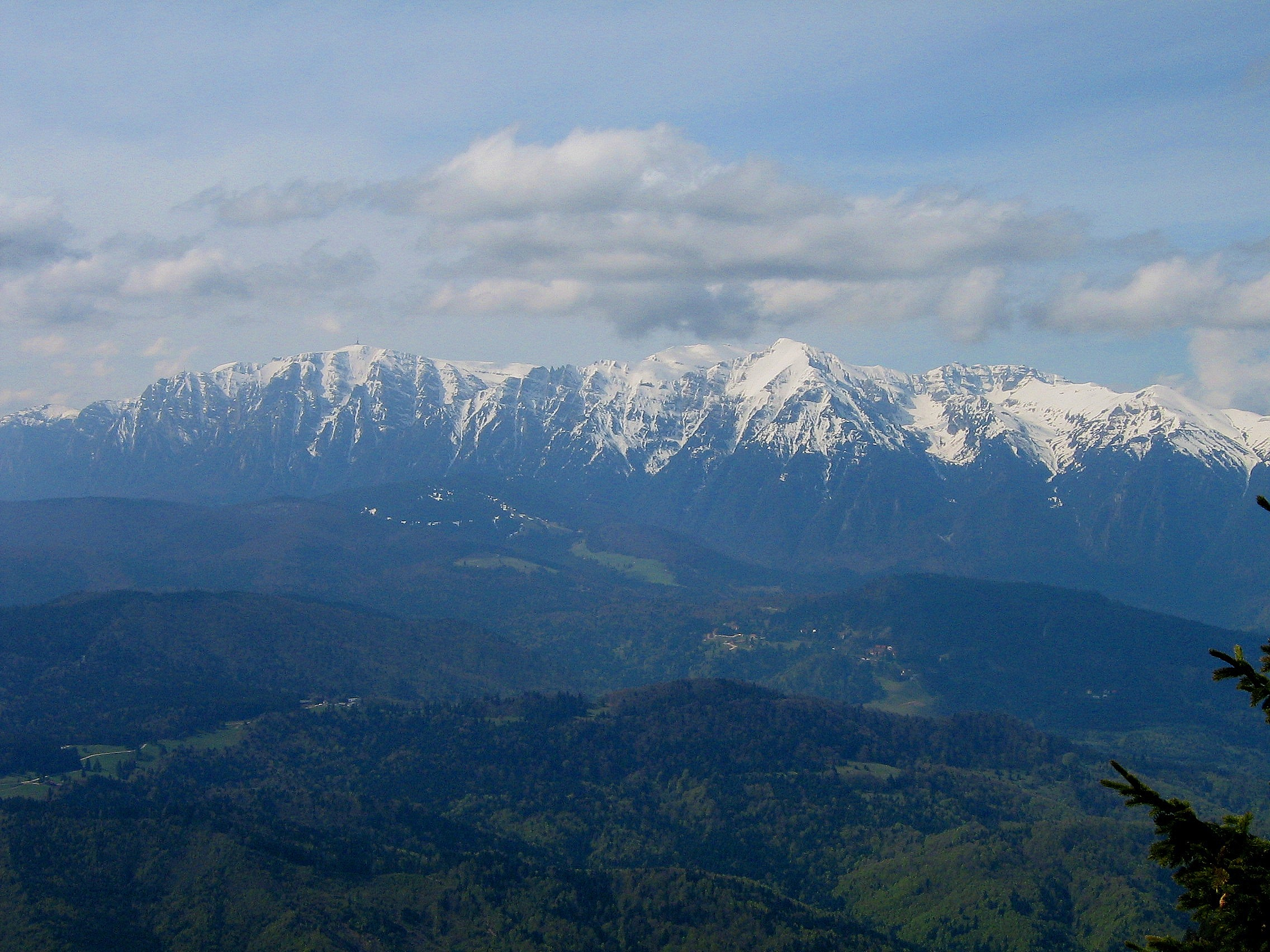
Bucegi as seen from Postavaru massif

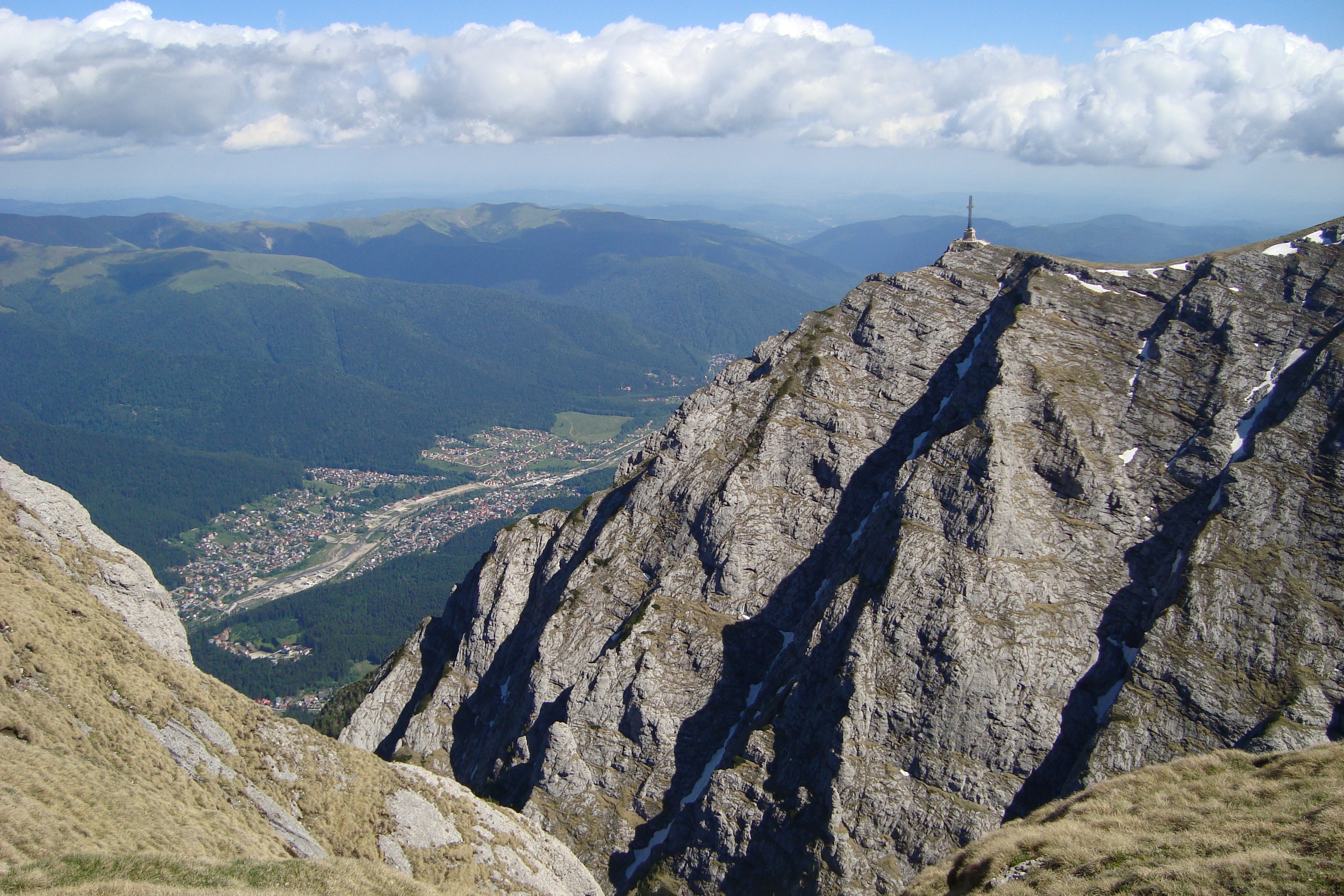
Caraiman Cross on mountain top

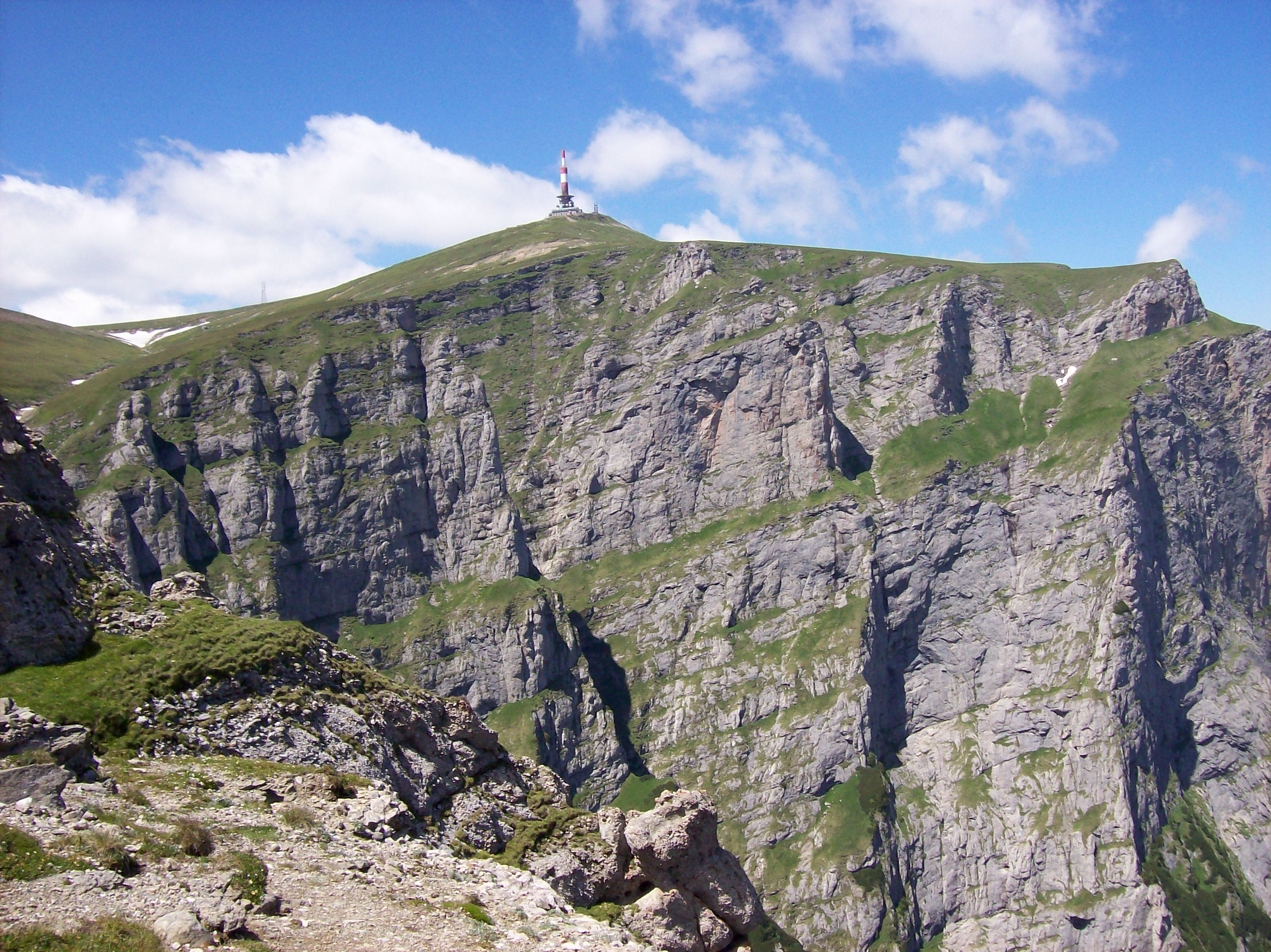
Coștila 400 meters high wall

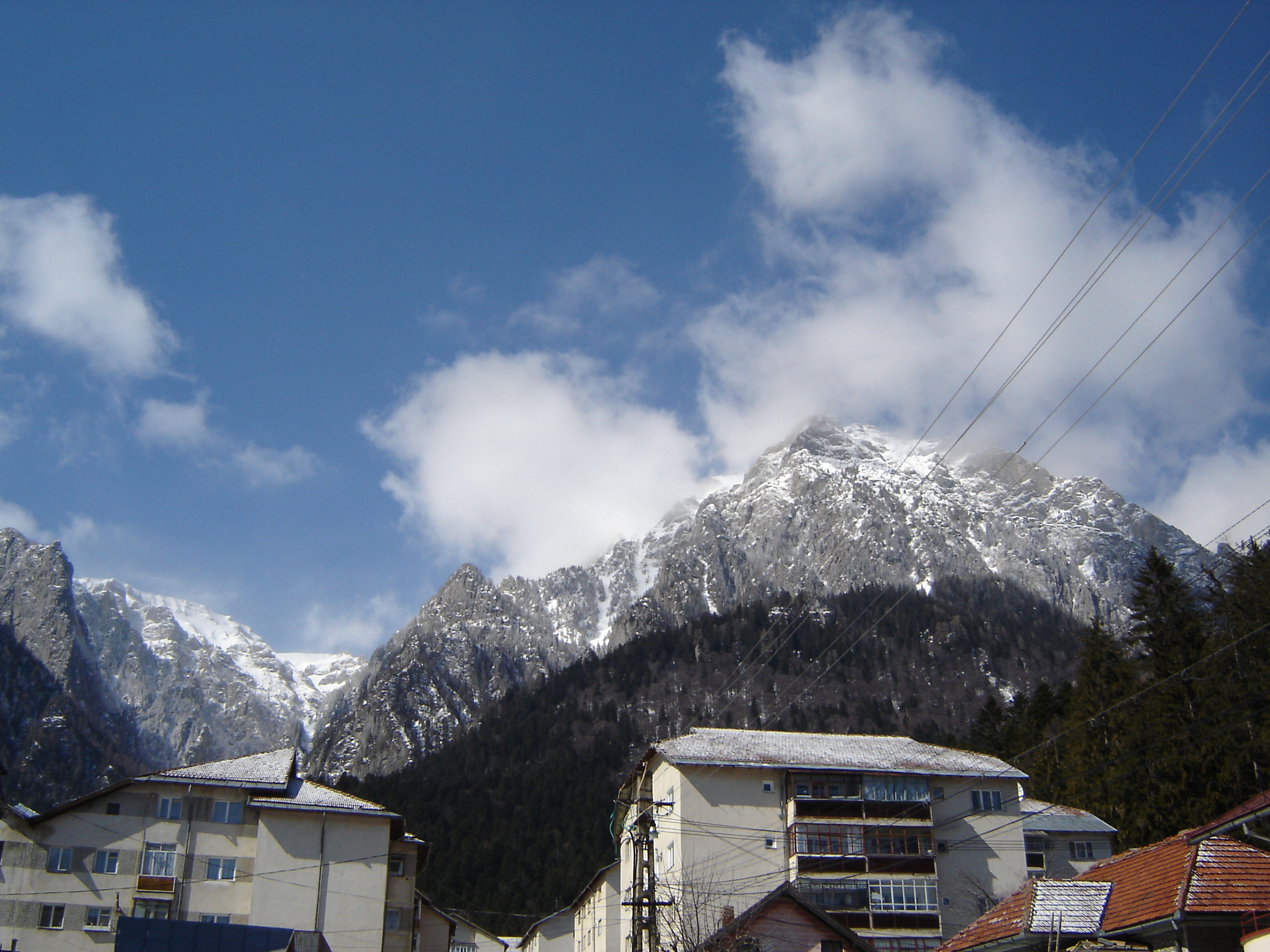
View from Bușteni

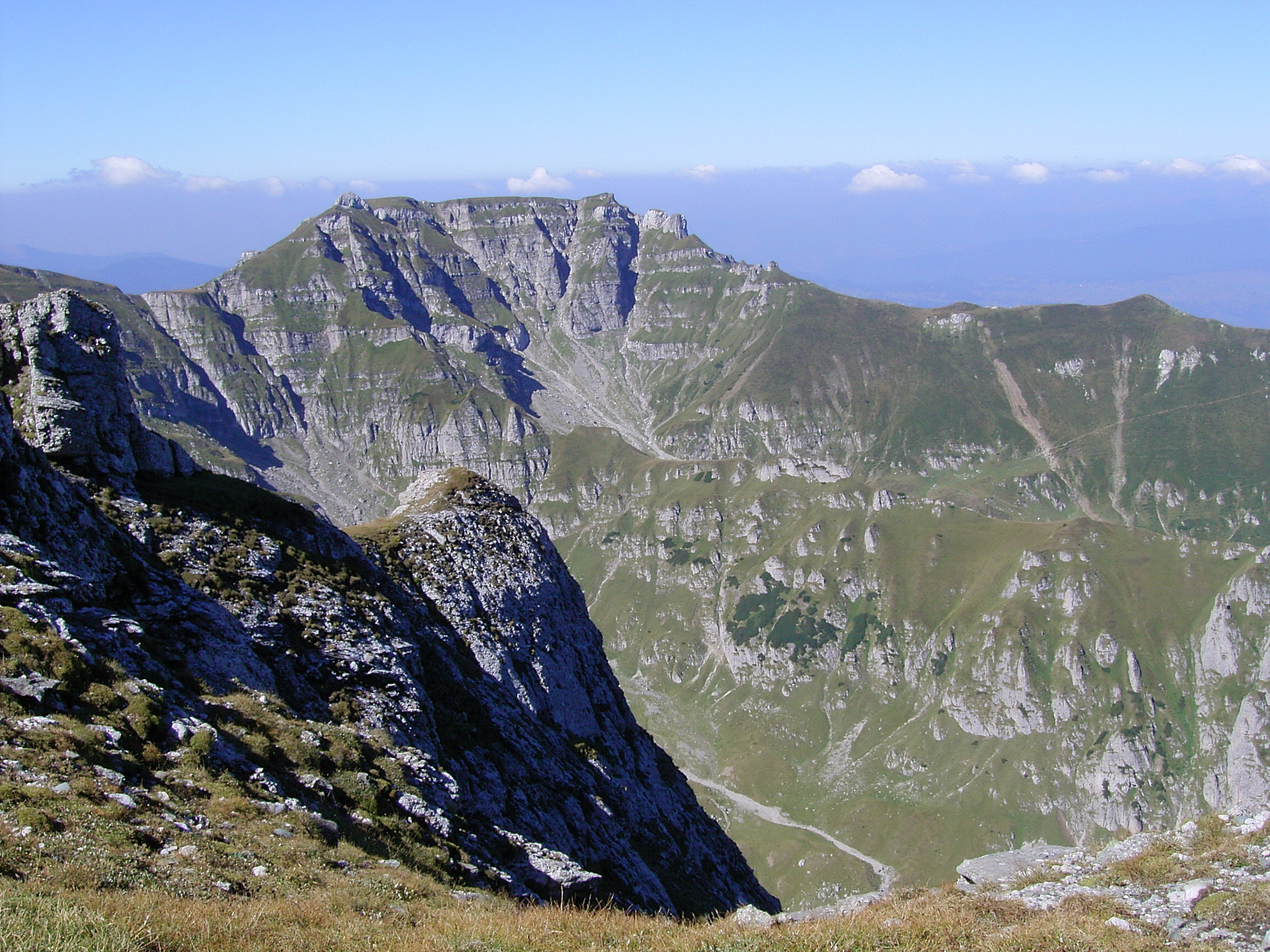
Scara summit in Bucegi Mountains

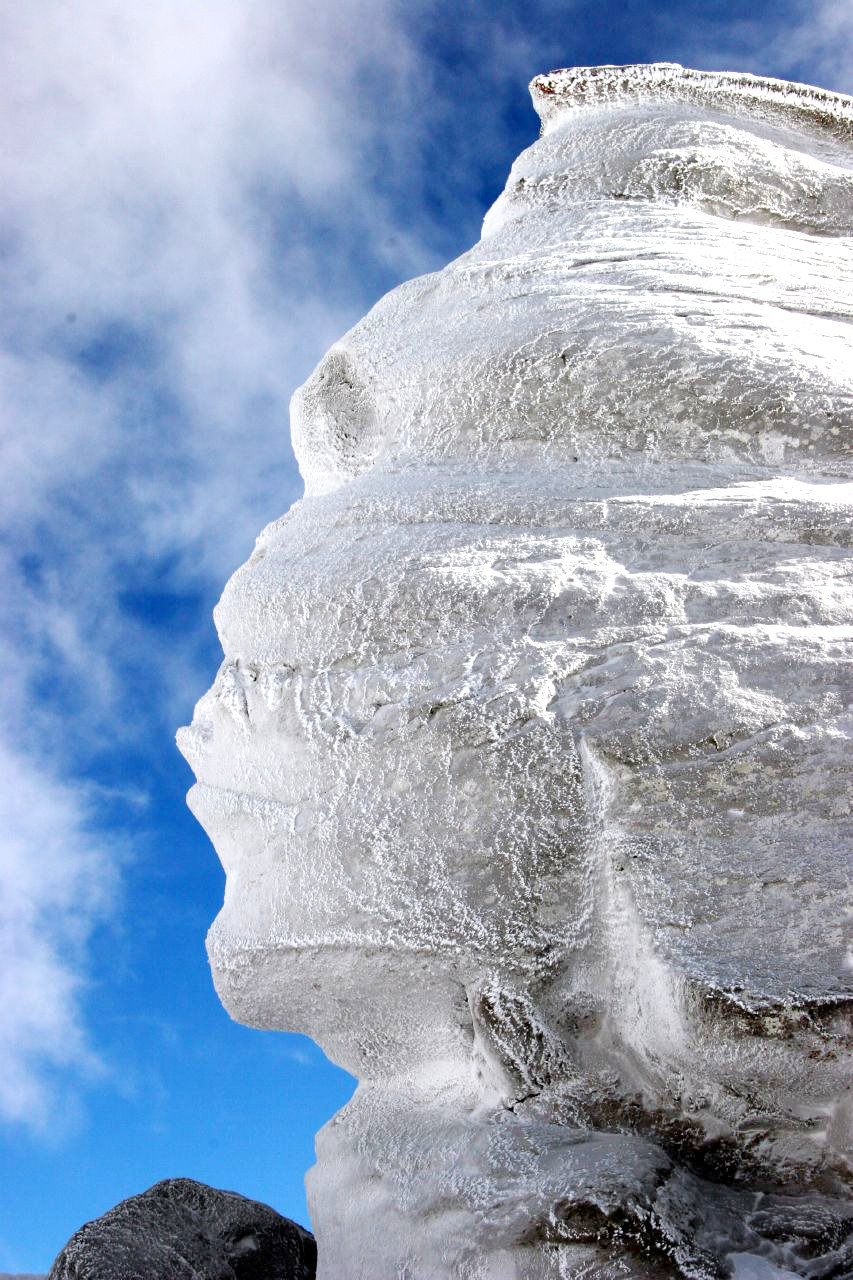
The Sphinx of Bucegi

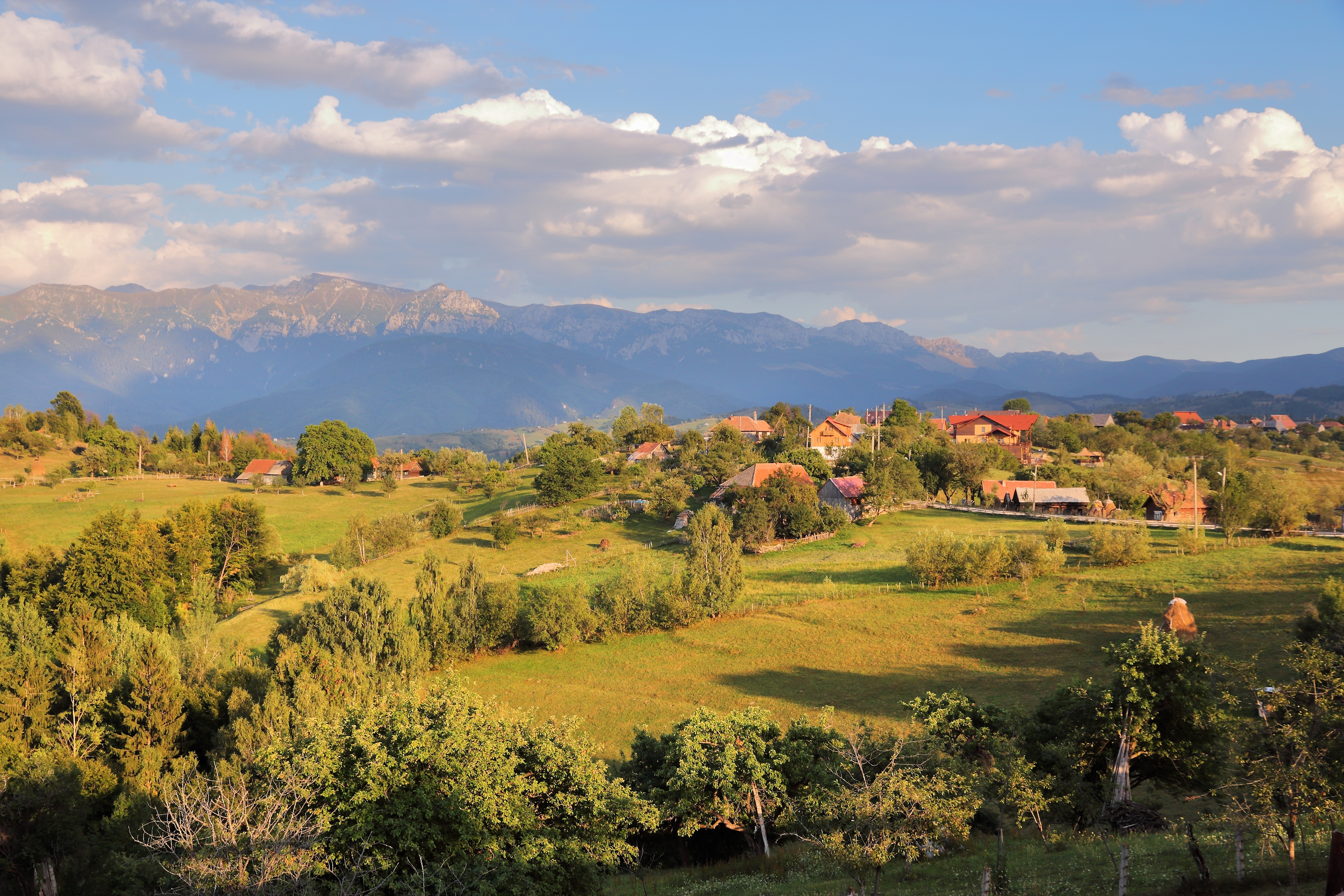
Piatra Craiului Mountains

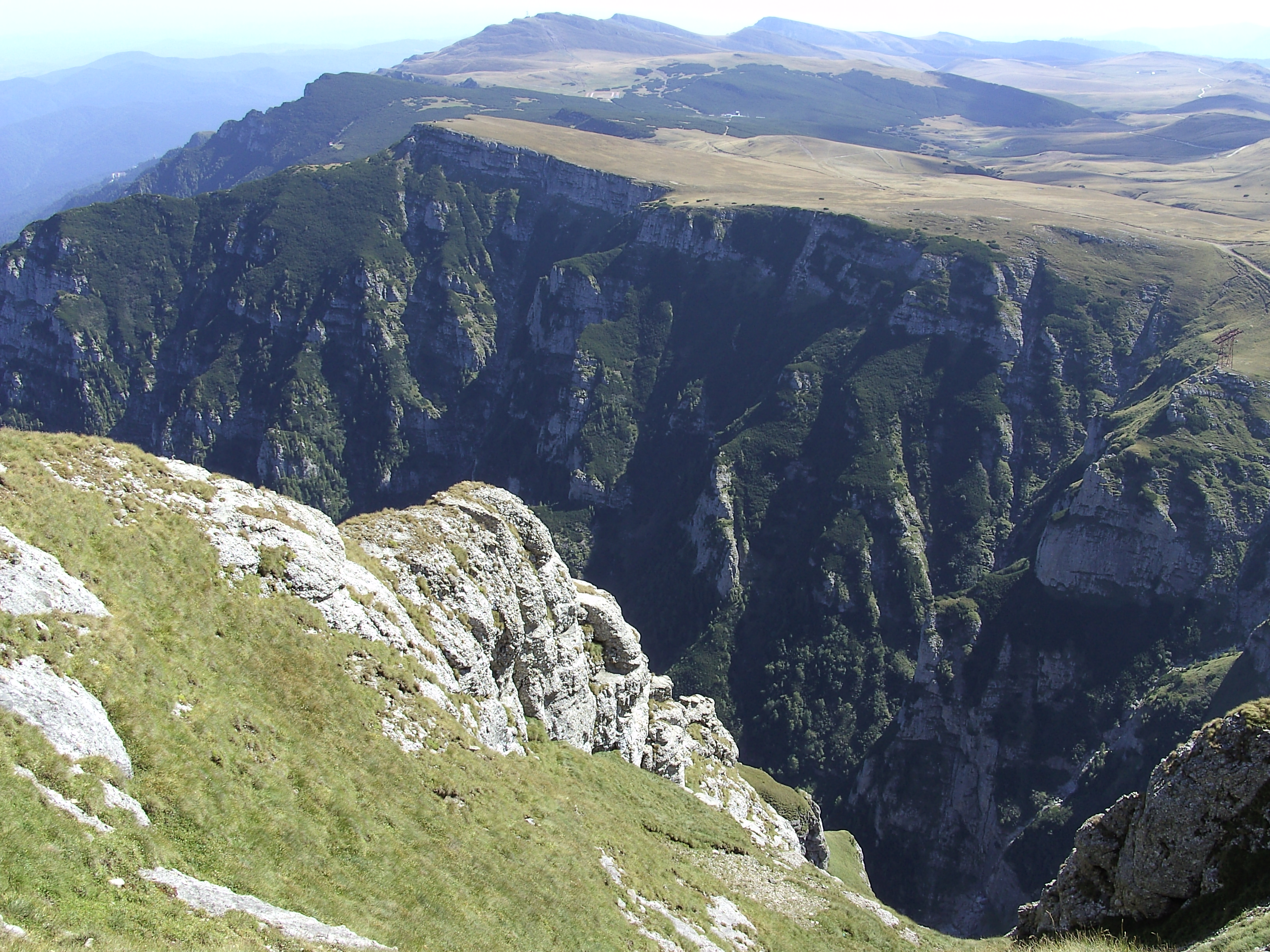
Jepii Mici Peak in Bucegi Mountains

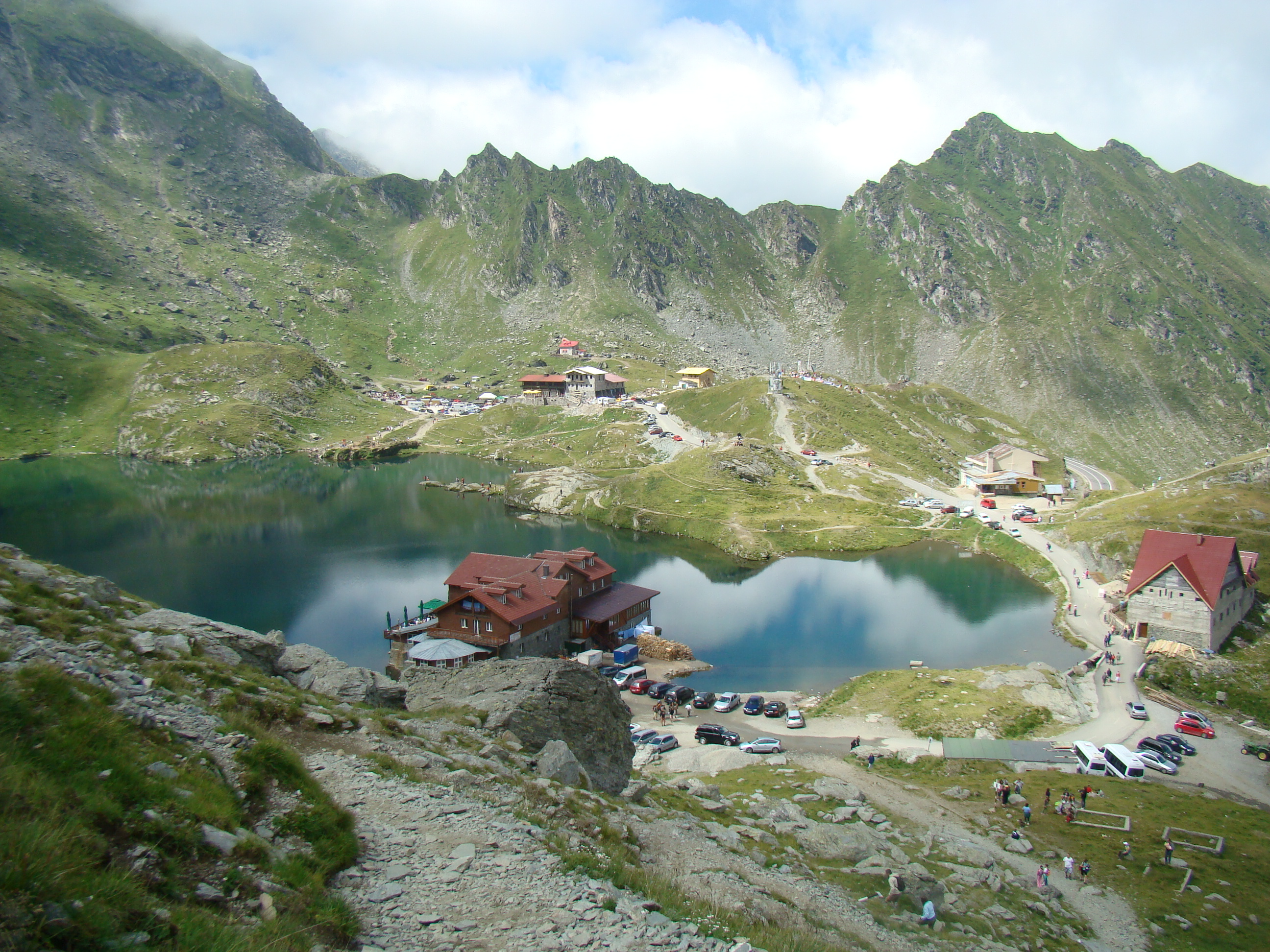
Lake Bâlea in Făgăraș Mountains

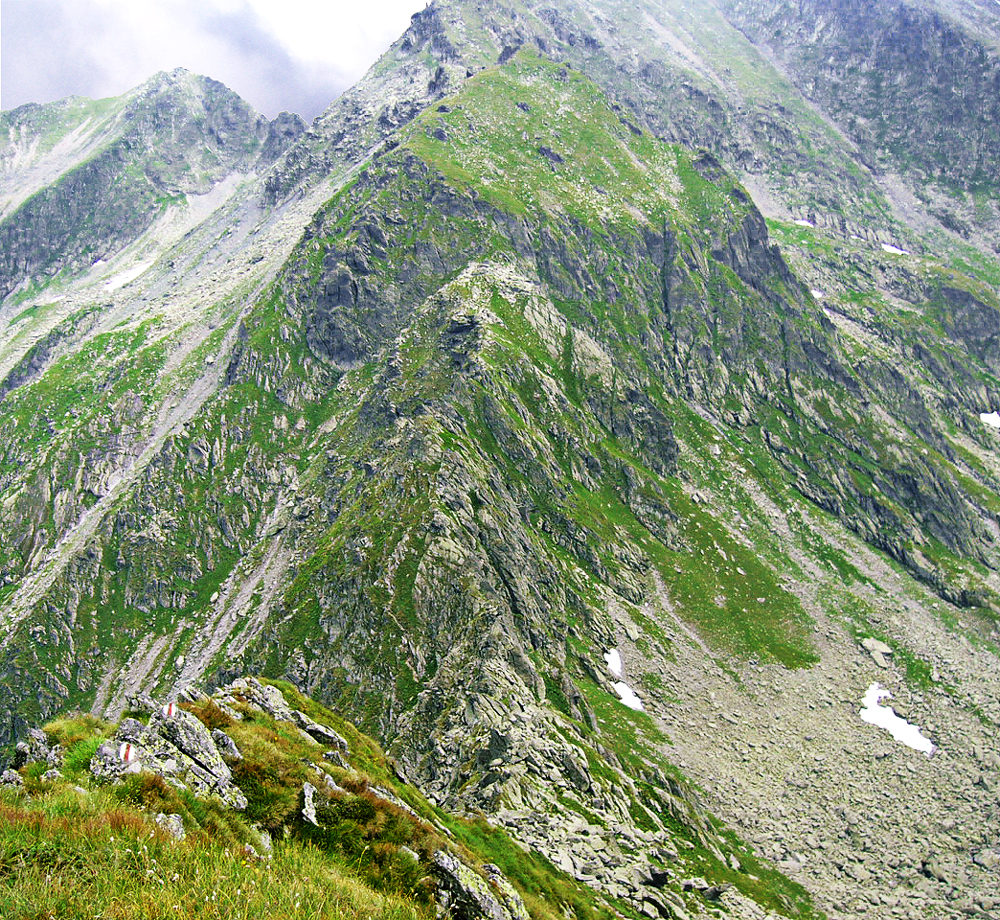
Challenging hiking trail

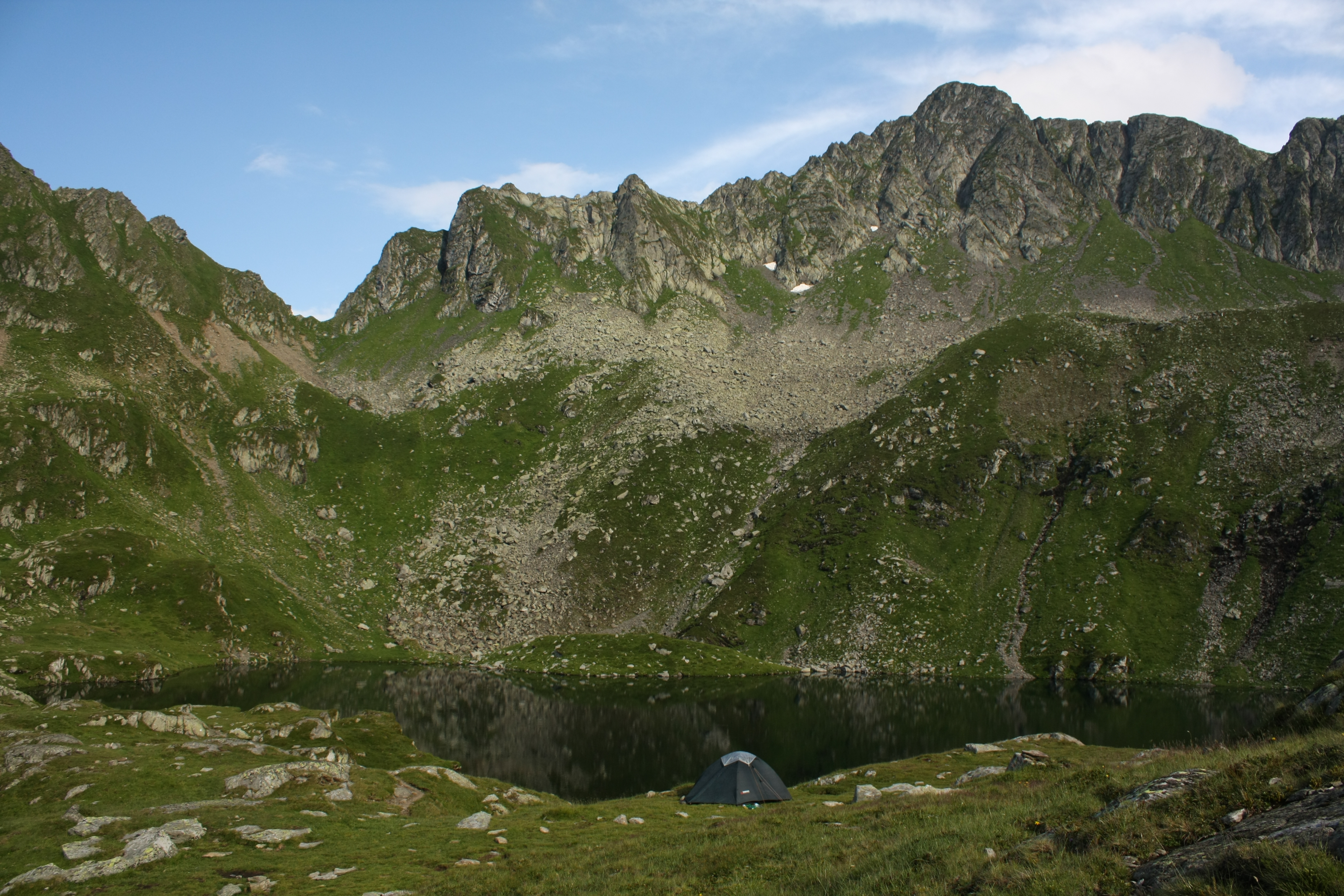
Podragu Lake

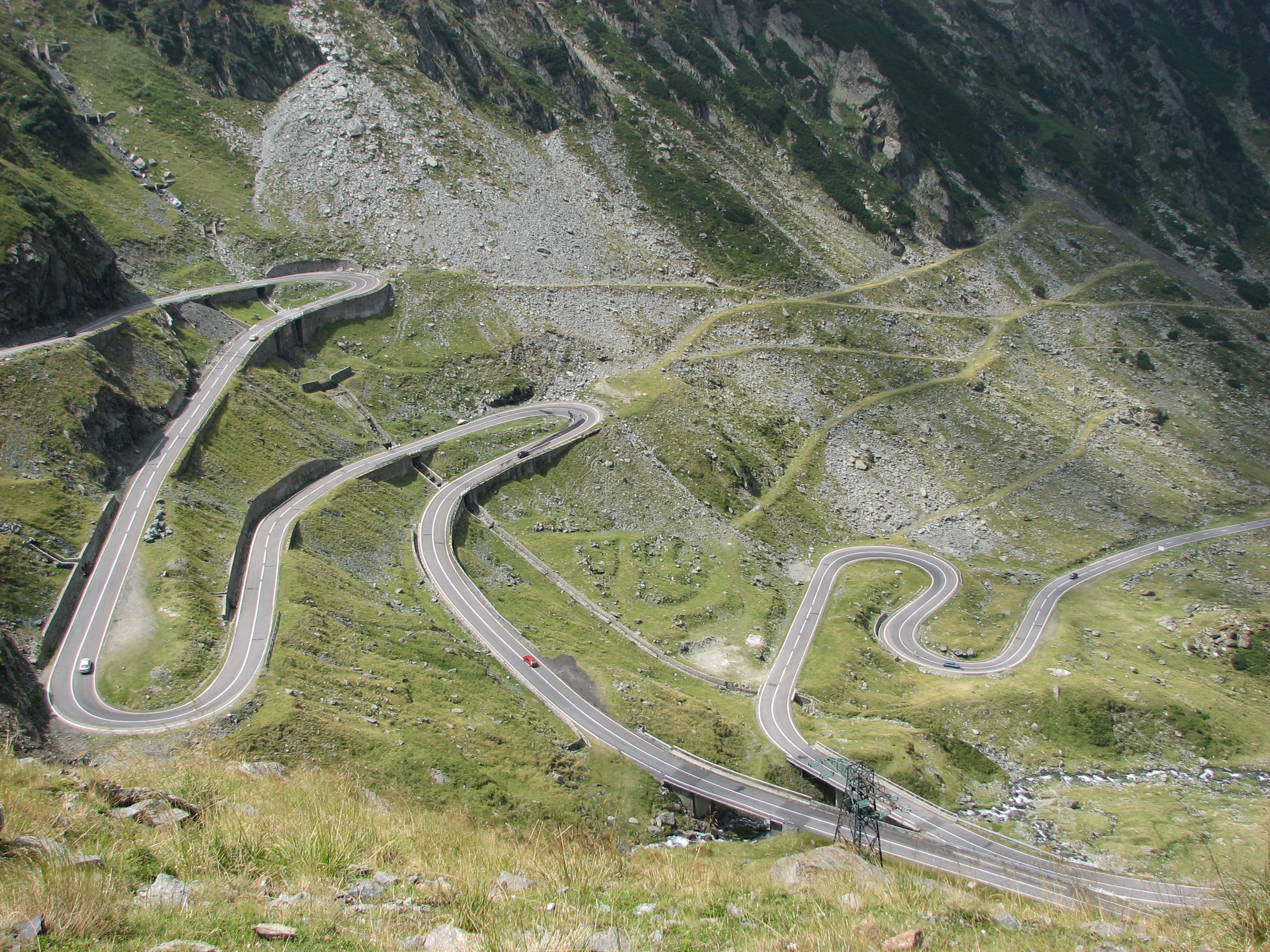
Transfăgărășan alpine road

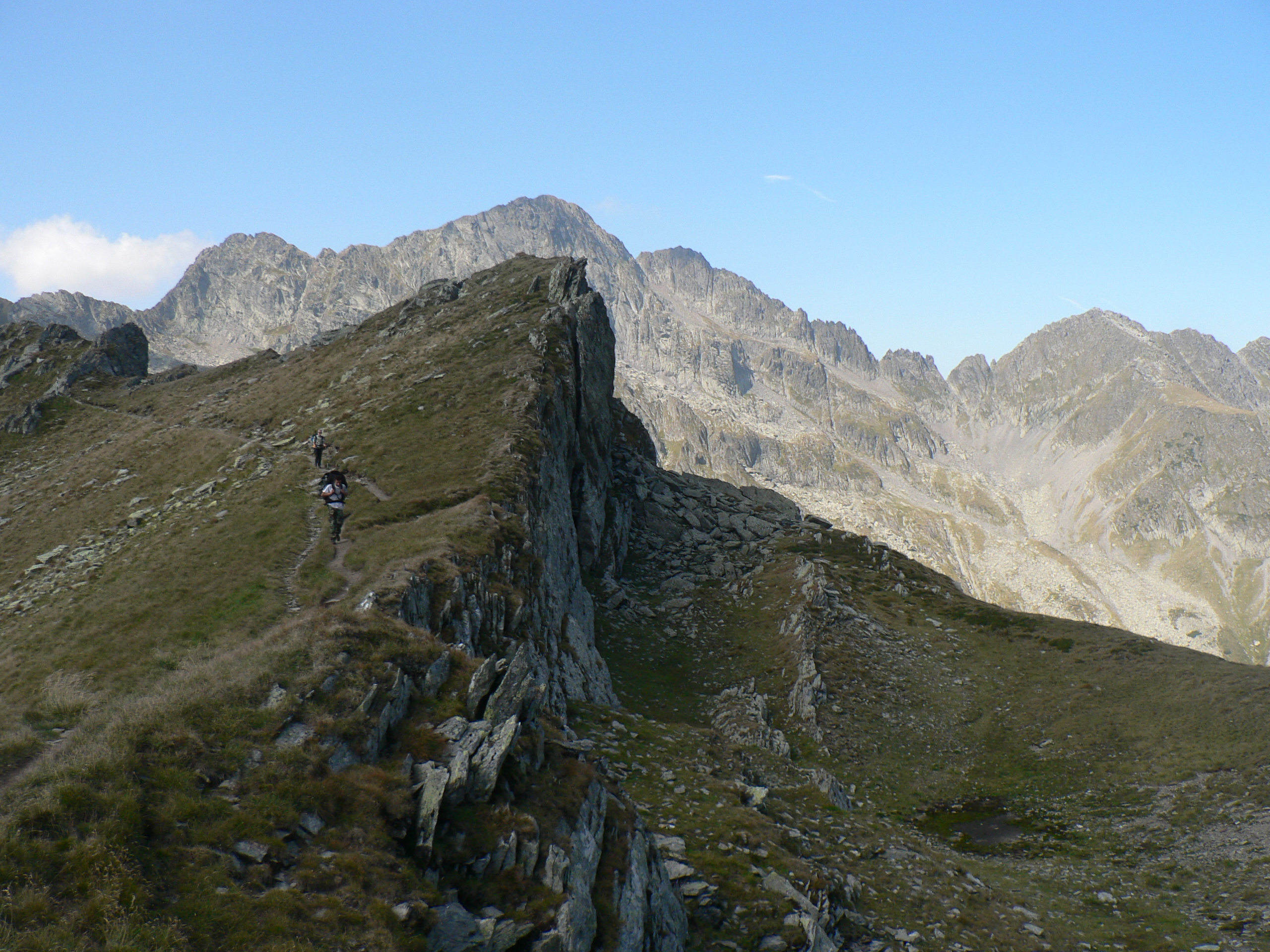
Regular footpath in Făgăraș Mountains

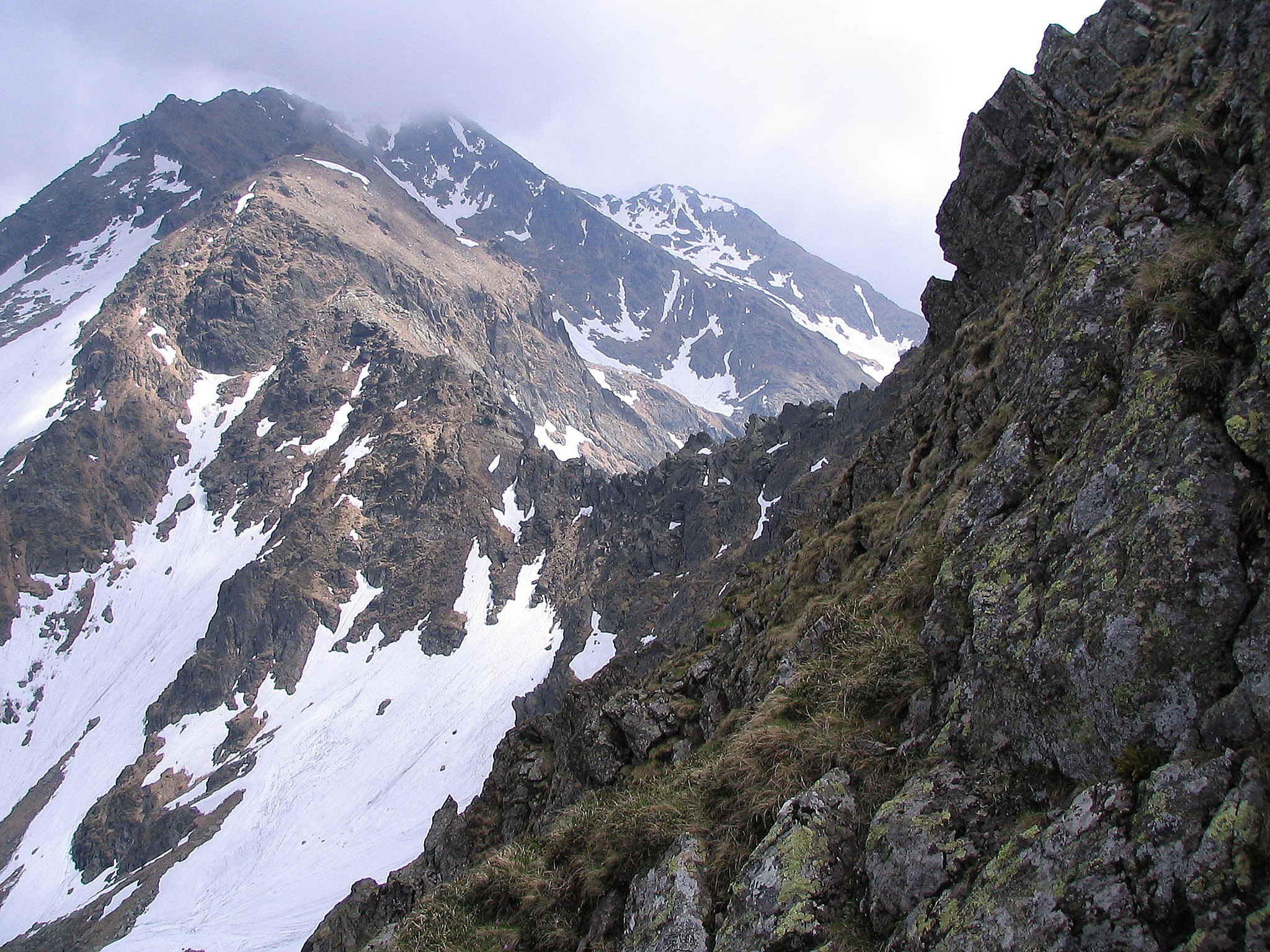
Custura Sărătii (in the center of the photo)

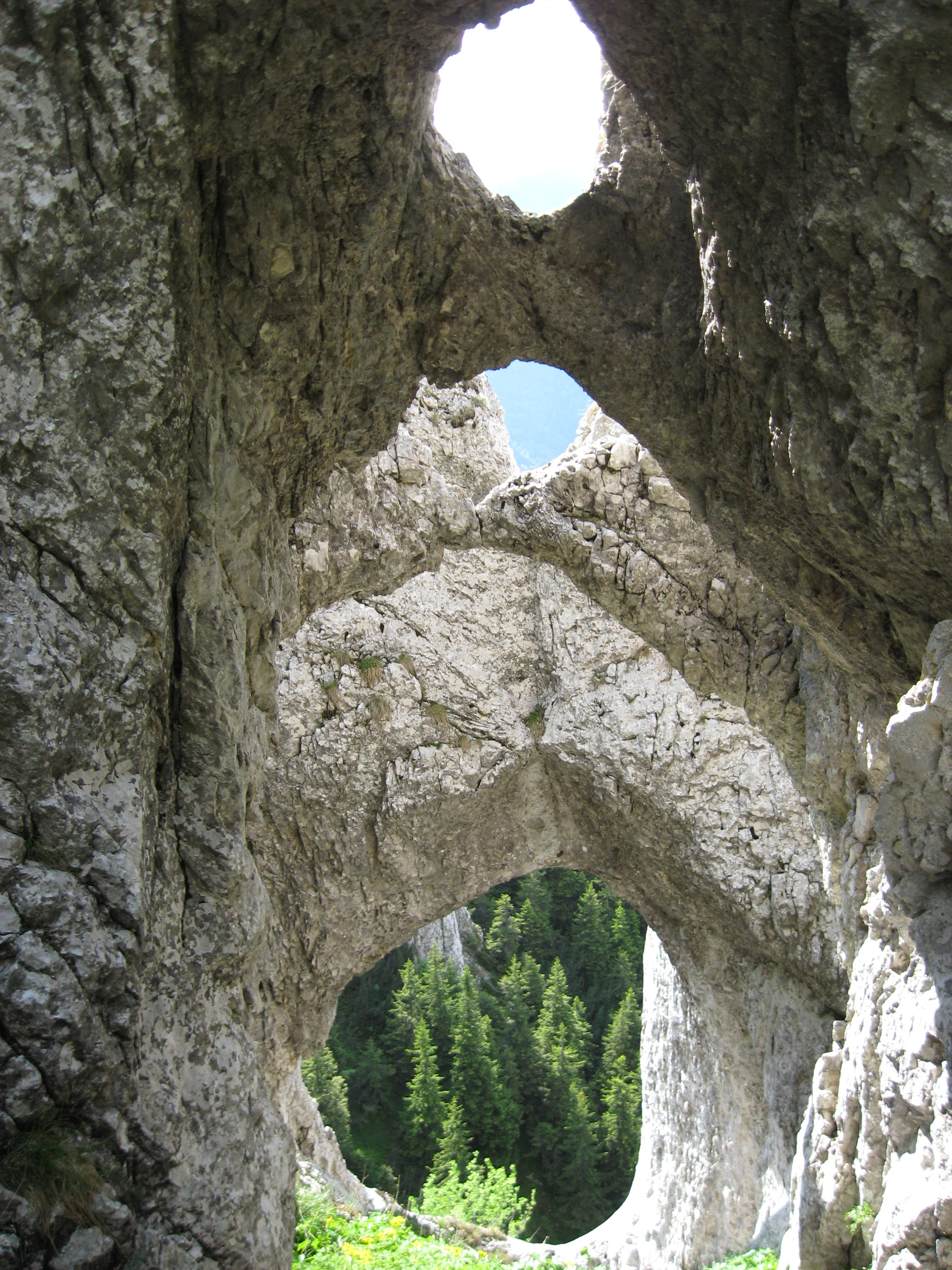
La Zaplaz landmark

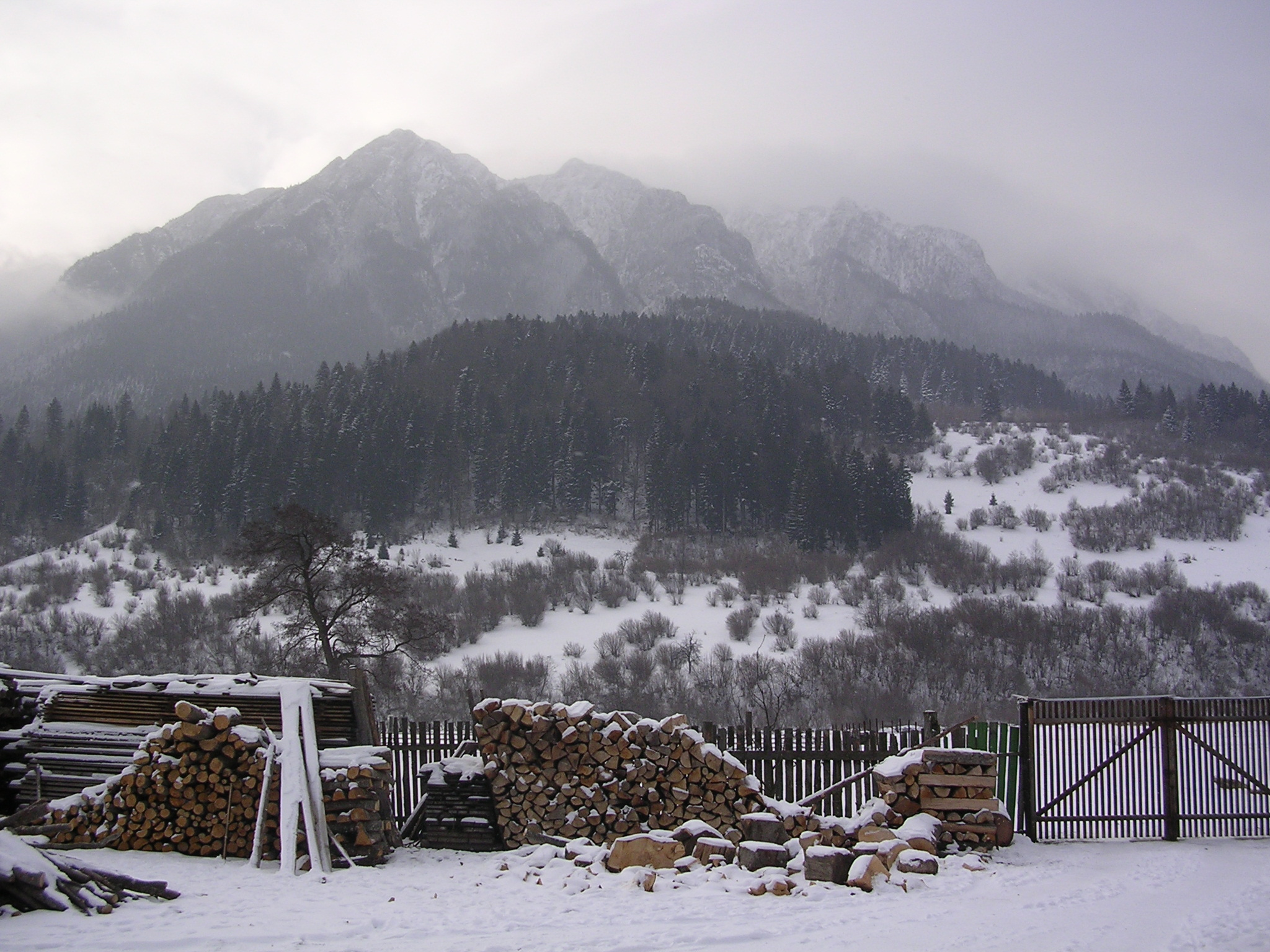
Piatra Craiului ridge in winter

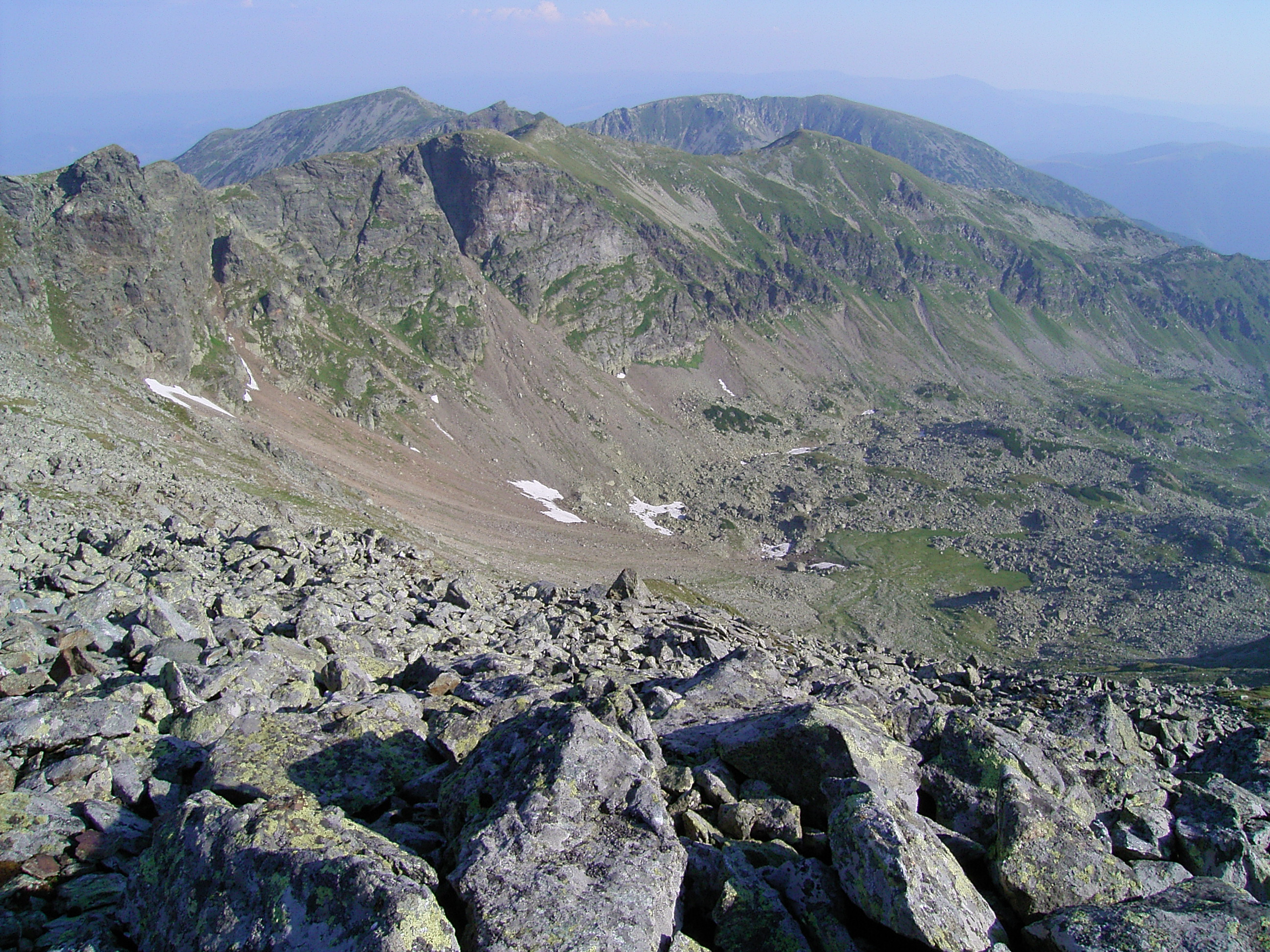
Landscape in Parâng Mountains

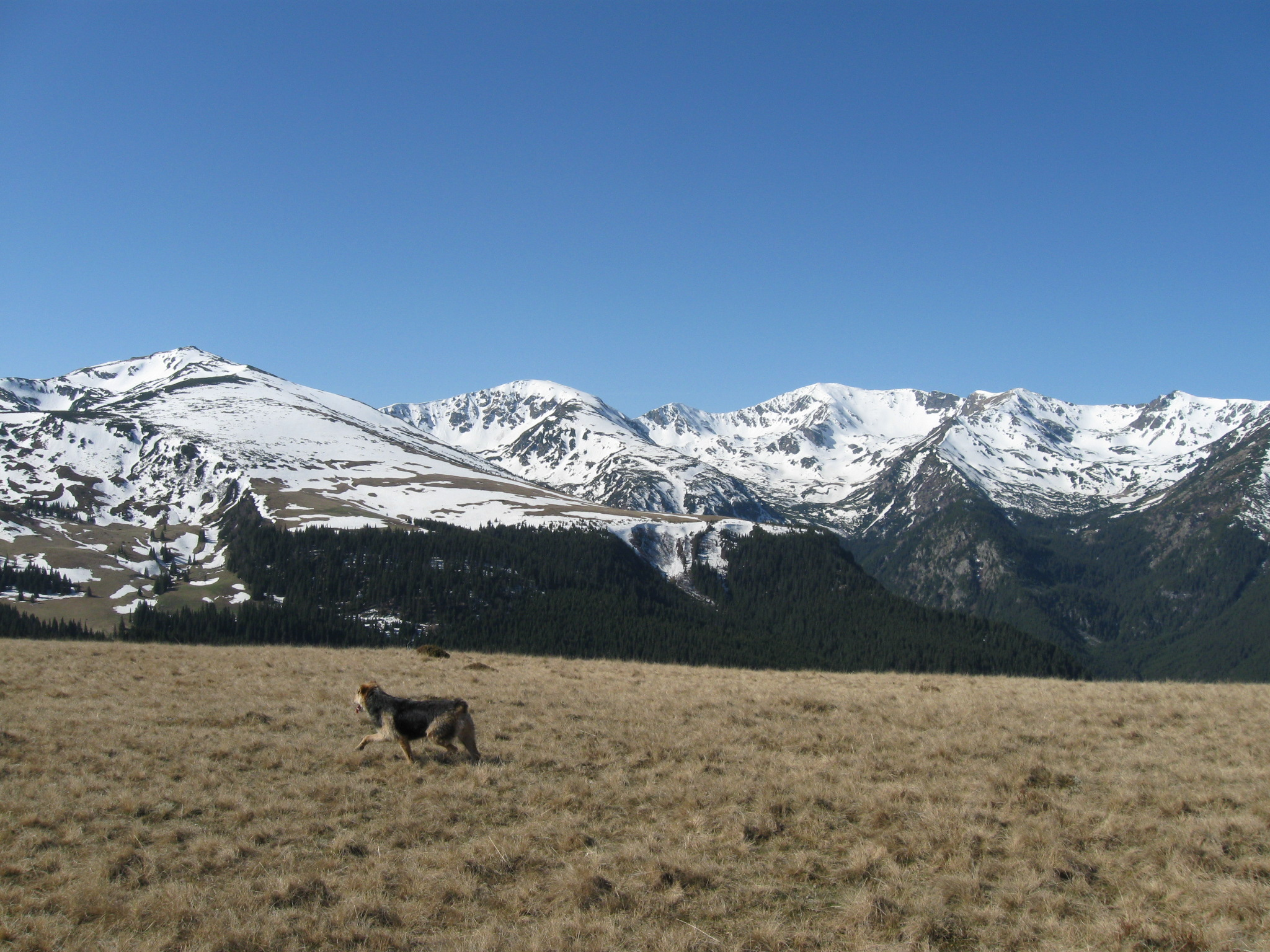
Parâng alpine scenery

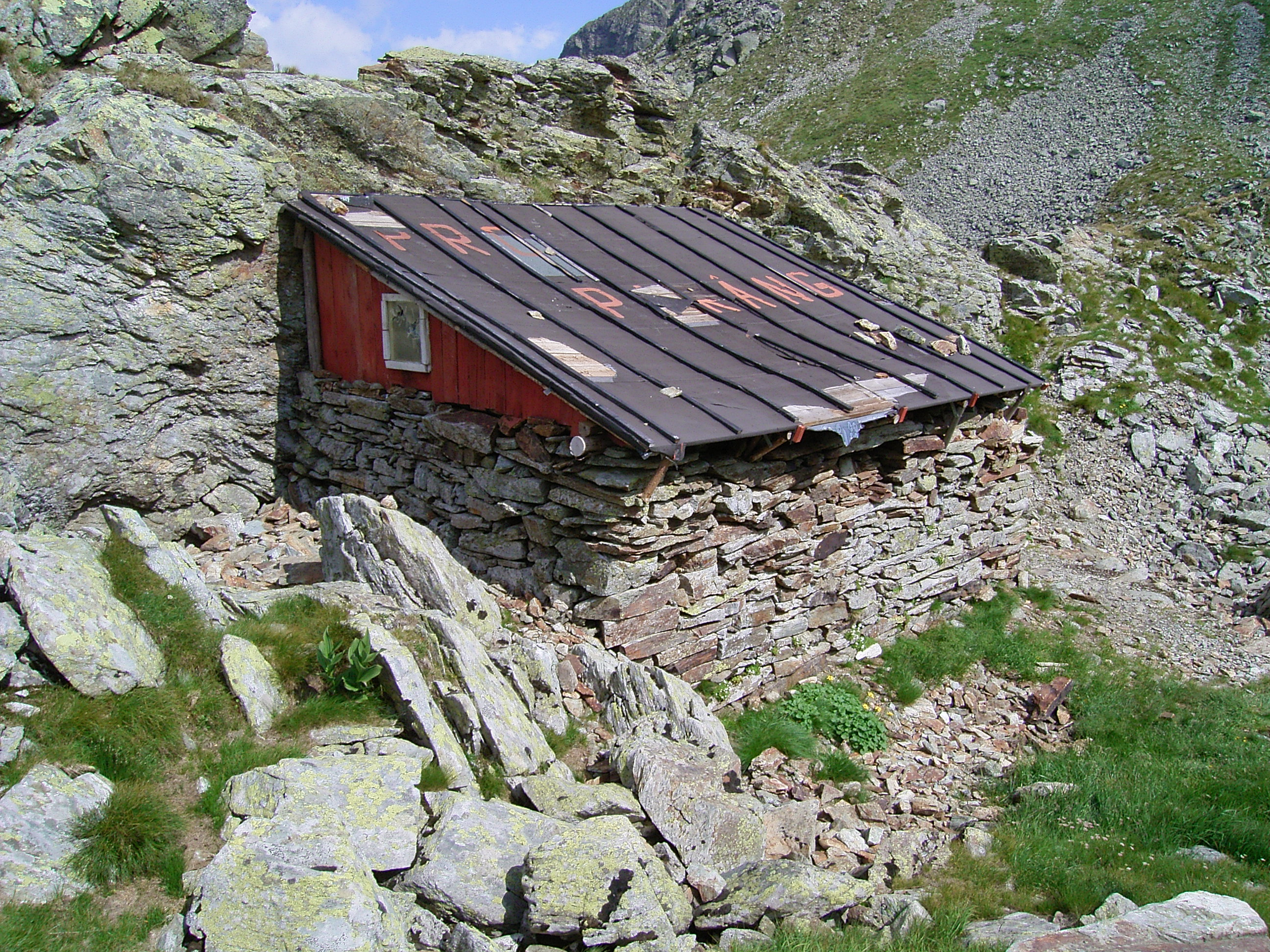
Shelter in Parâng mountains

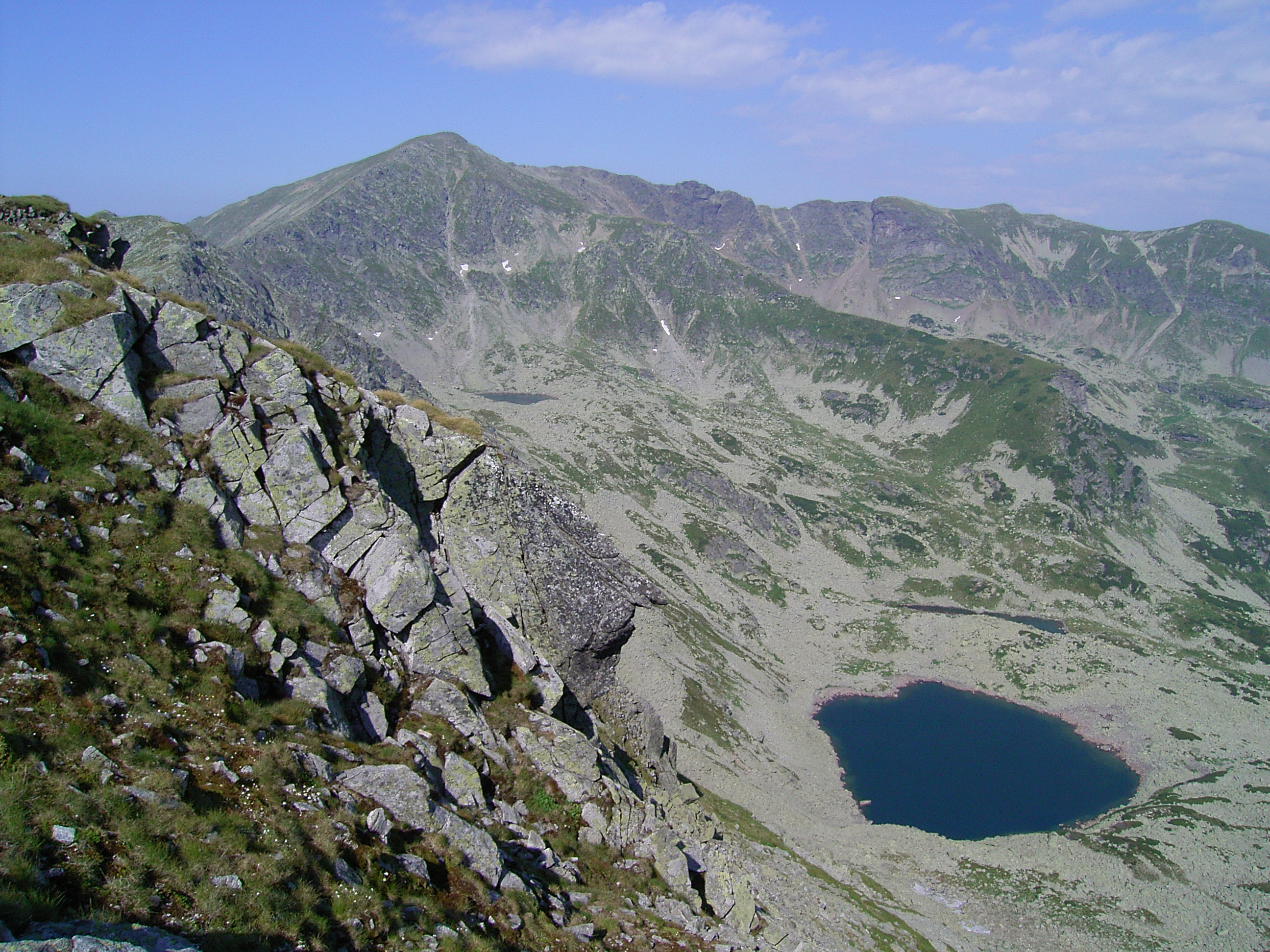
One of many Parâng glacial lakes

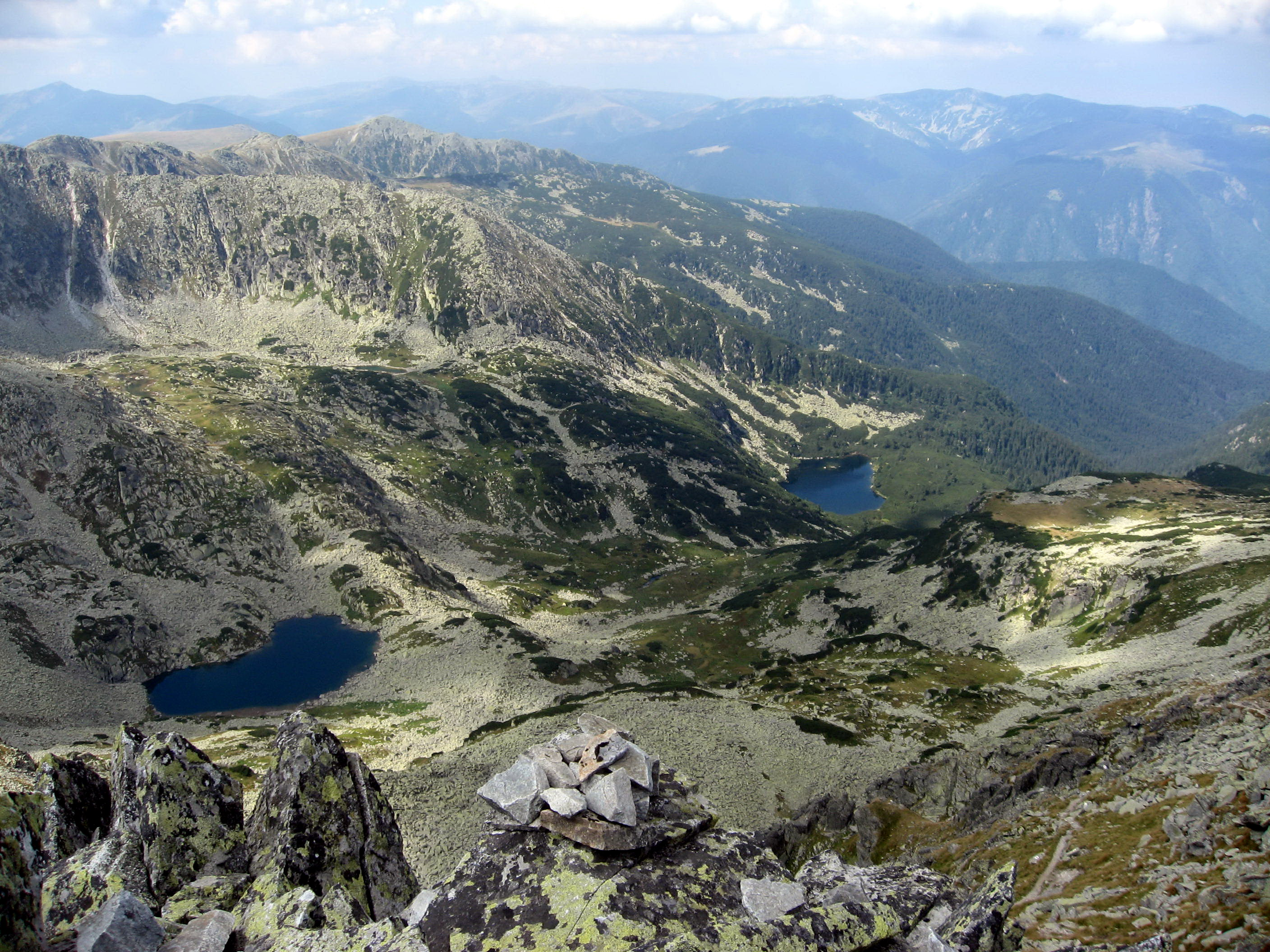
Glacial lakes in the Retezat Mountains

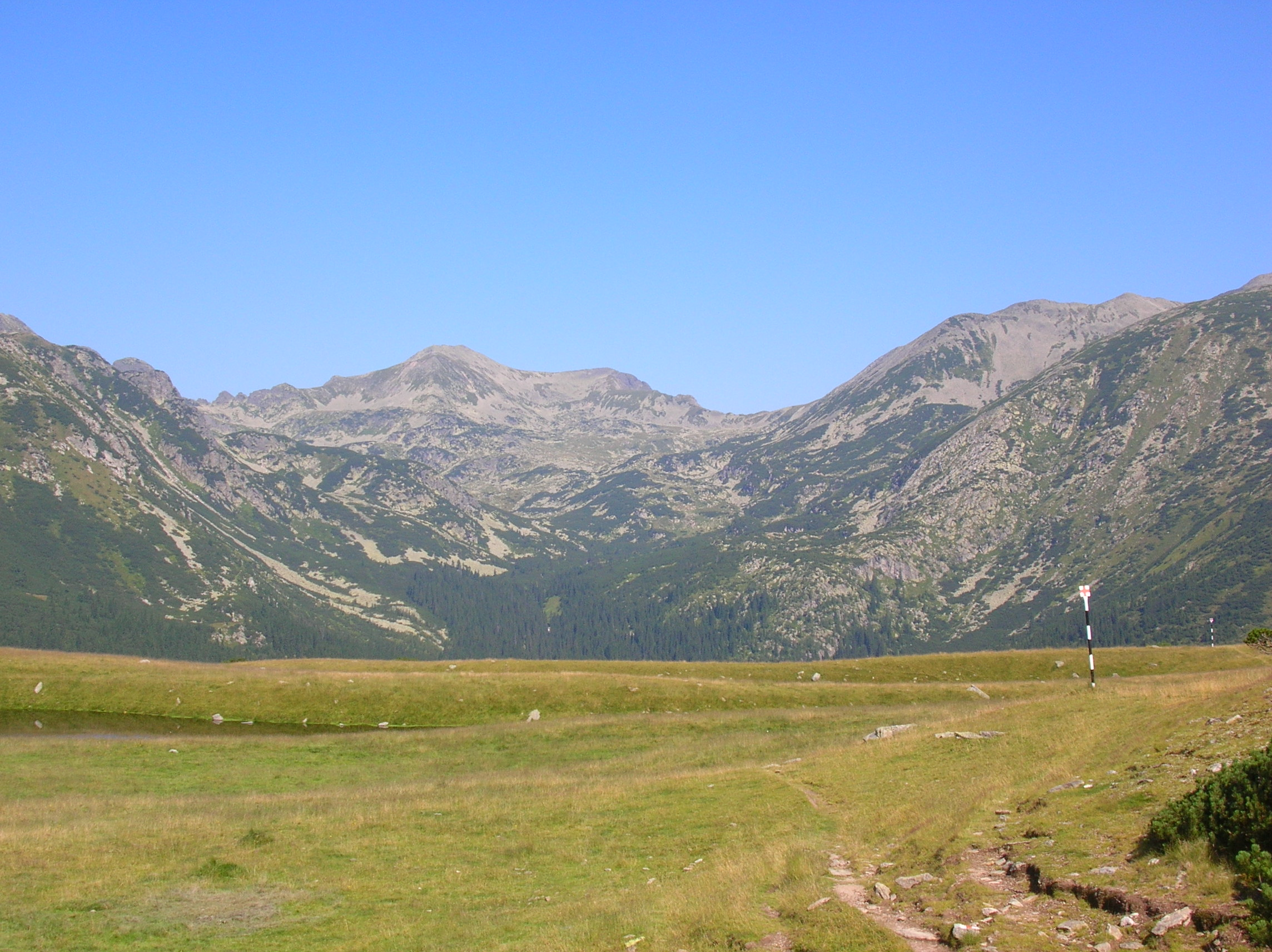
Bucura Peak in the distance

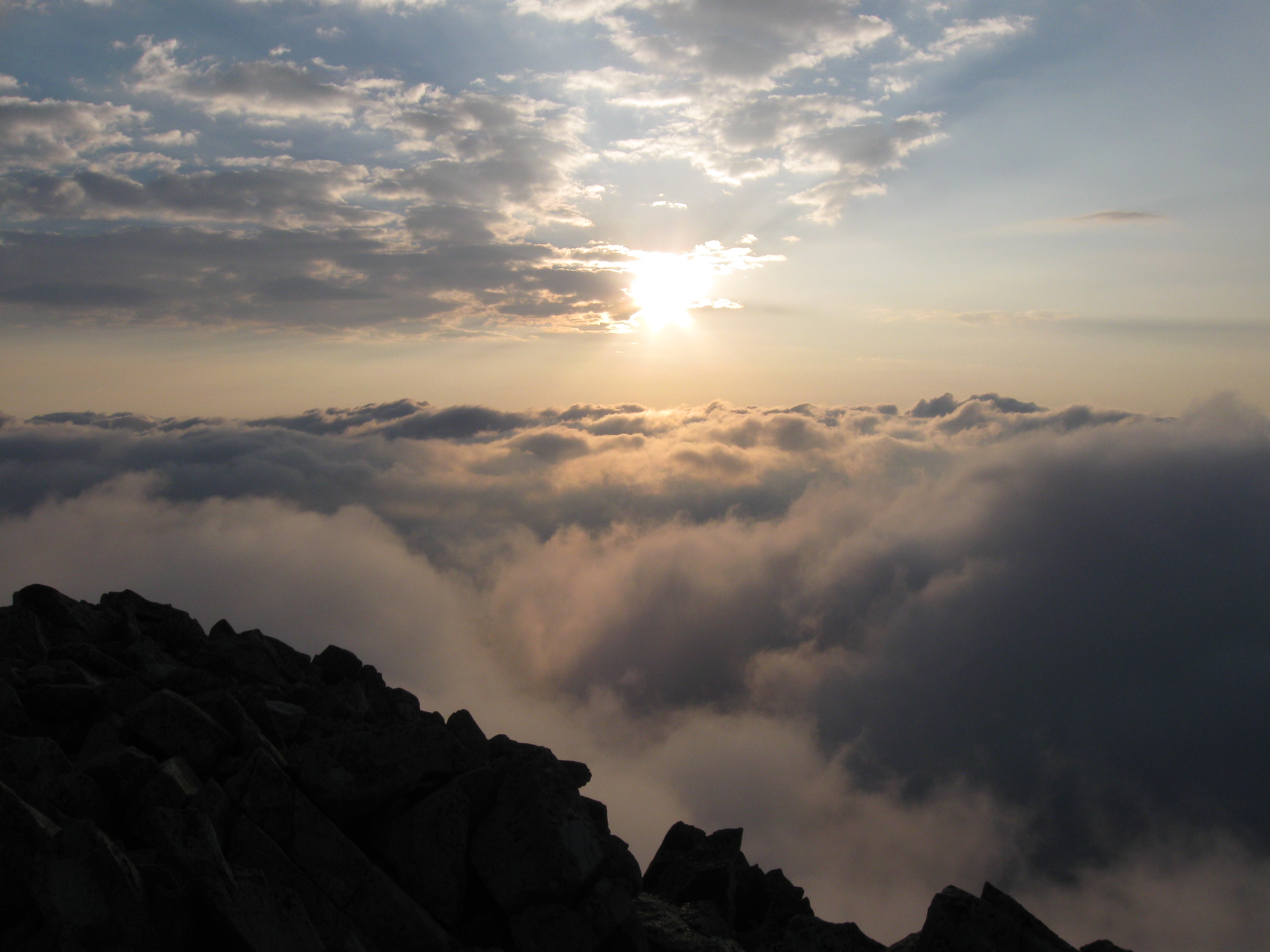
Sunset on Retezat Peak

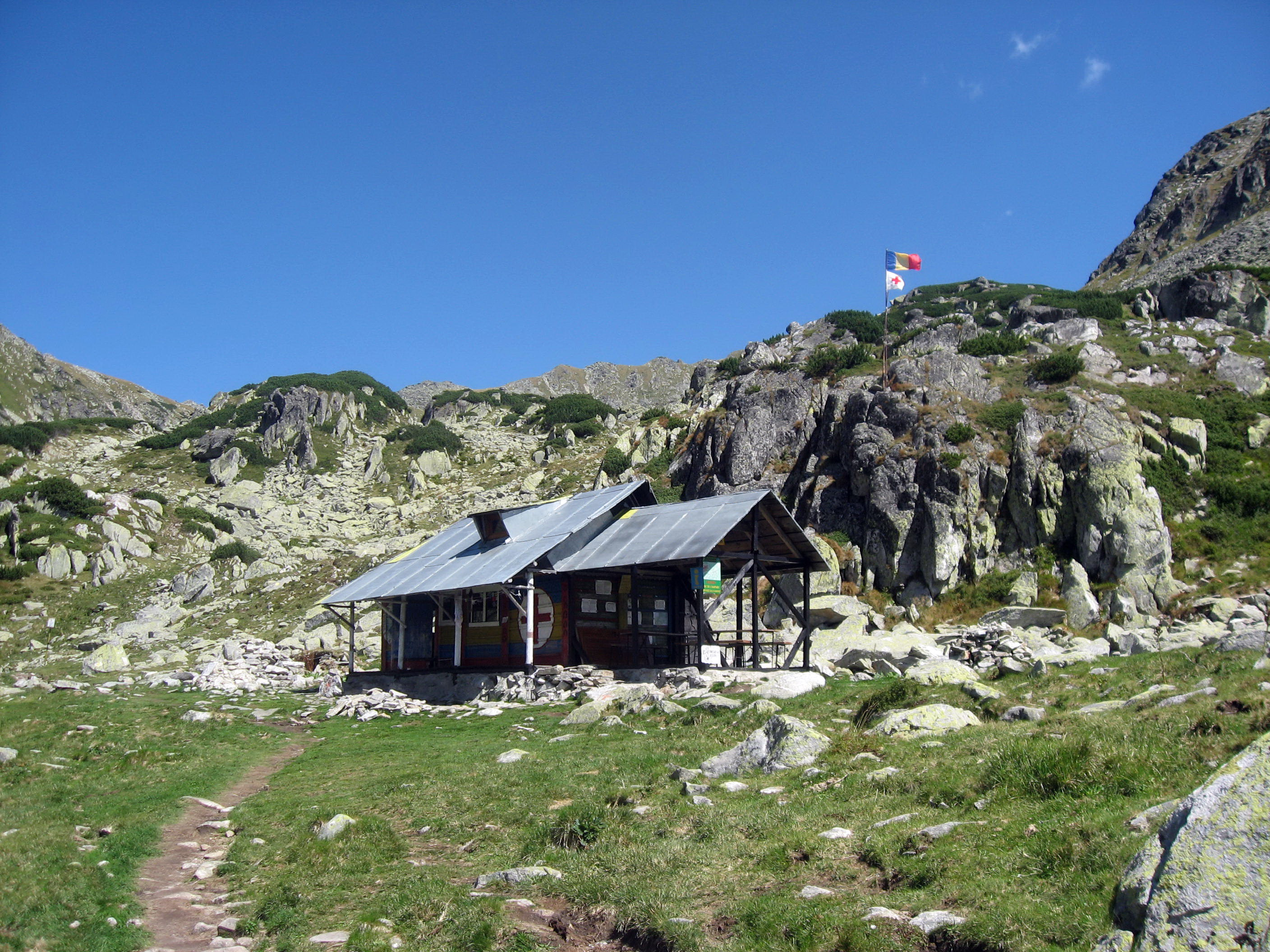
Salvamont shelter in Retezat

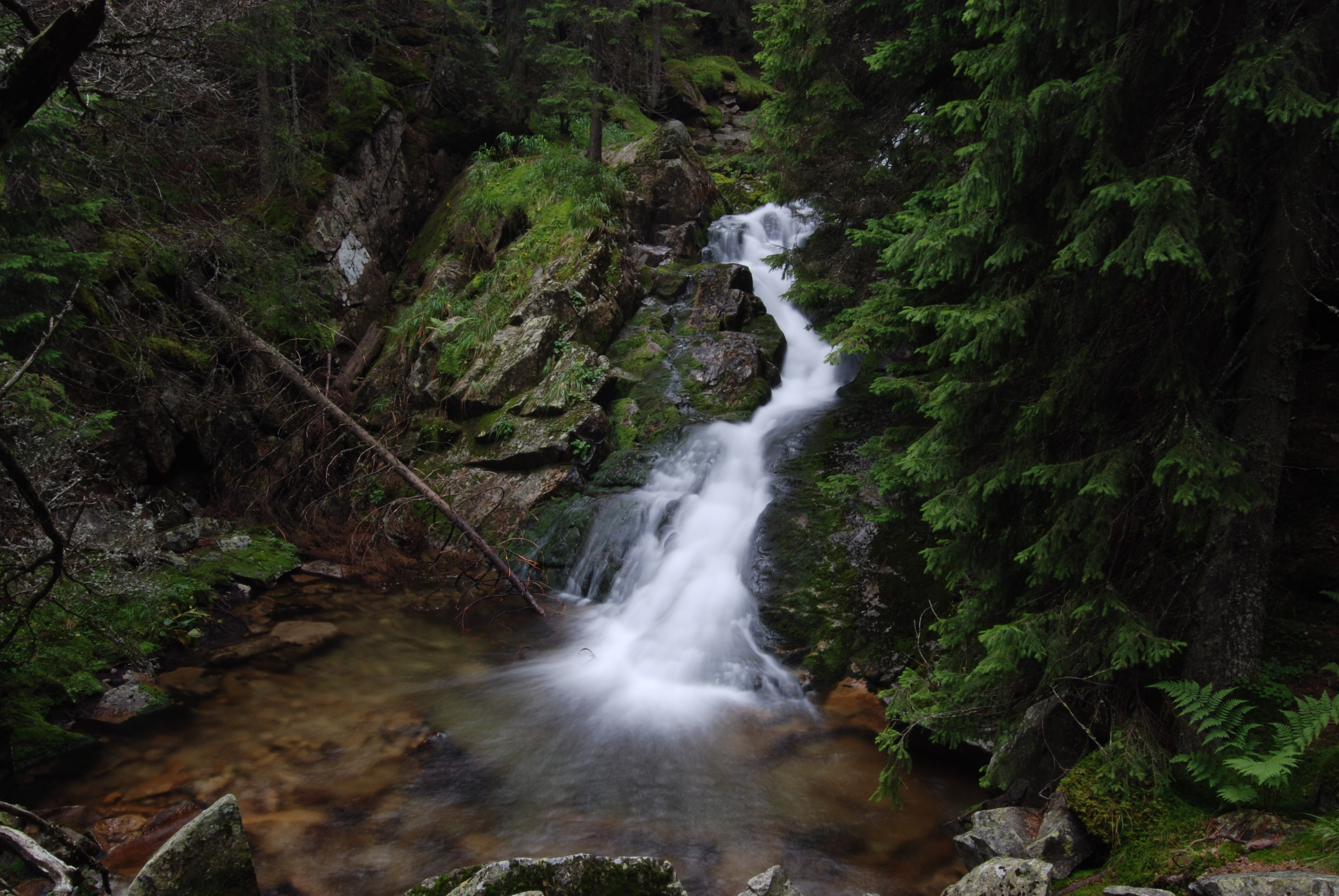
Waterfall in Retezat National Park

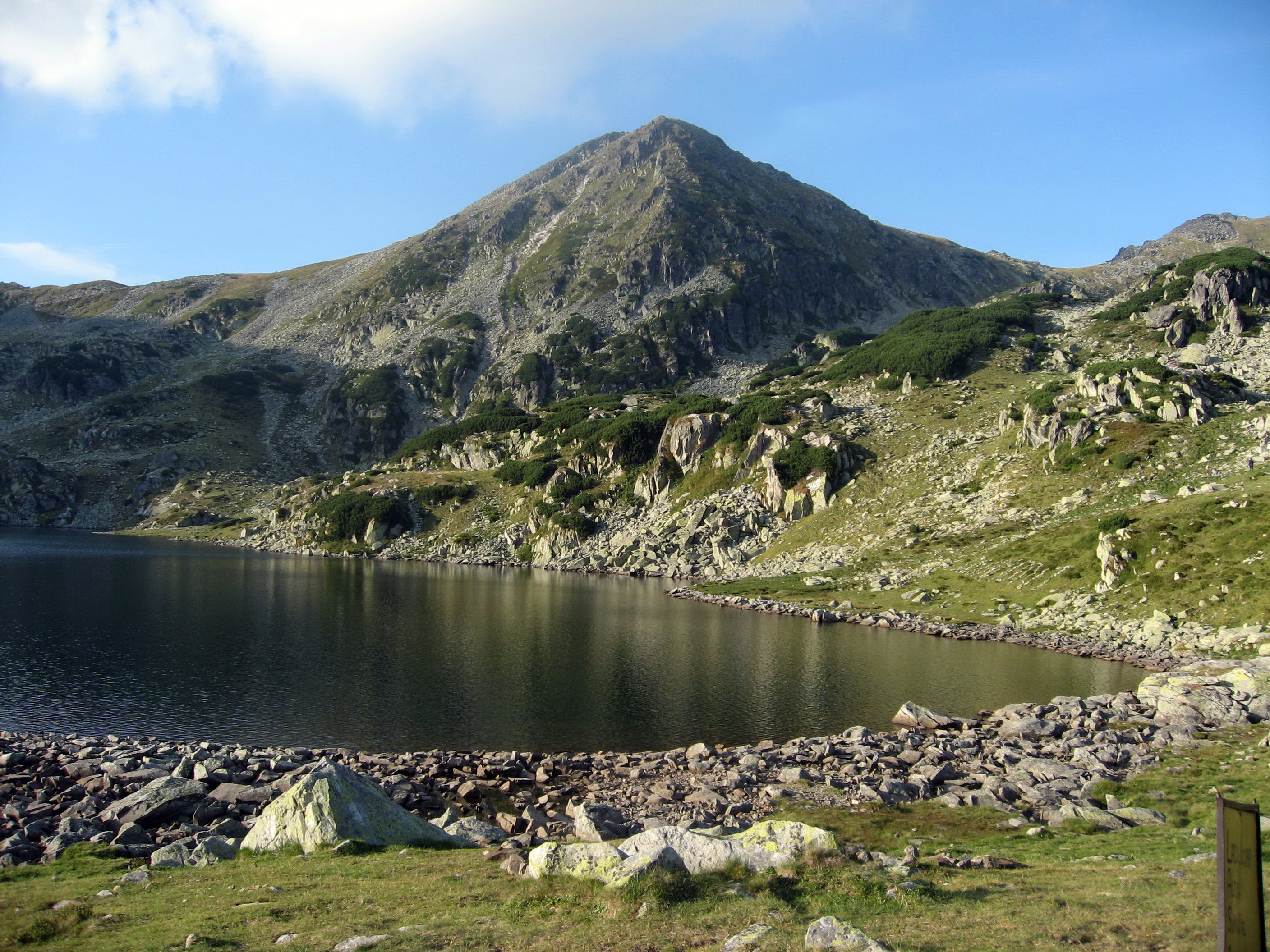
Bucura Lake

== See also ==
- Romanian Carpathians
- Divisions of the Carpathians
- Iron Gates, at the South-Western end
- Prahova Valley, at the Eastern end
