= Raciu (river) =

- Location within Romania

Location
- Country: Romania
- Counties: Dâmbovița County

Physical characteristics
- Source: Leaota Mountains
- Mouth: Ialomița
  - coordinates: 45.2641°N 25.4018°E
- Length: 11 km (6.8 mi)
- Basin size: 17 km^{2} (6.6 sq mi)

Basin features
- Progression: Ialomița→ Danube→ Black Sea
- Tributaries
  - right: Valea Brădetului

The Raciu (in its upper course also: Leaota) is a right tributary of the river Ialomița in Romania. Its source is in the Leaota Mountains. It flows into the Ialomița between Dobrești and Pucheni. Its length is 11 km (6.8 mi) and its basin size is 17 km^{2} (6.6 sq mi).
