= Leaota Mountains =

Coordinates: 45.3145°N 25.2864°E

Leaota Mountains 3D

The Leaota Mountains are located in central Romania, north of the city of Târgoviște. They are part of the Southern Carpathians group of the Carpathian Mountains, and are near the Bucegi Mountains to the east and the Piatra Craiului to the west. The mountains cover an area of 346 km^{2} (134 sq mi) within the Dâmbovița, Argeș, and Brașov counties.

Leaota Peak is the highest point in the Leaota Mountains and rises to 2,133 metres (6,998 feet). It is known for its dense fir, spruce, and beech forests as well as its wild animals. It is not frequently visited by hikers and tourists for lack of infrastructure, but it contains active and scenic pastoral lands at high altitude.

== Leaota tourist shelter ==
The shelter was built in the 1940s at an altitude of 1,330 m (4,360 ft) above sea level. It is currently abandoned and is only sporadically used by passing tourists. In 1962 the chalet had running water, an electricity generator, a permanent buffet, and ski slopes nearby. Until 2004, a chalet of the same name operated on the Brăteiului valley, but is no longer included in the tourist circuit.

== Gallery ==

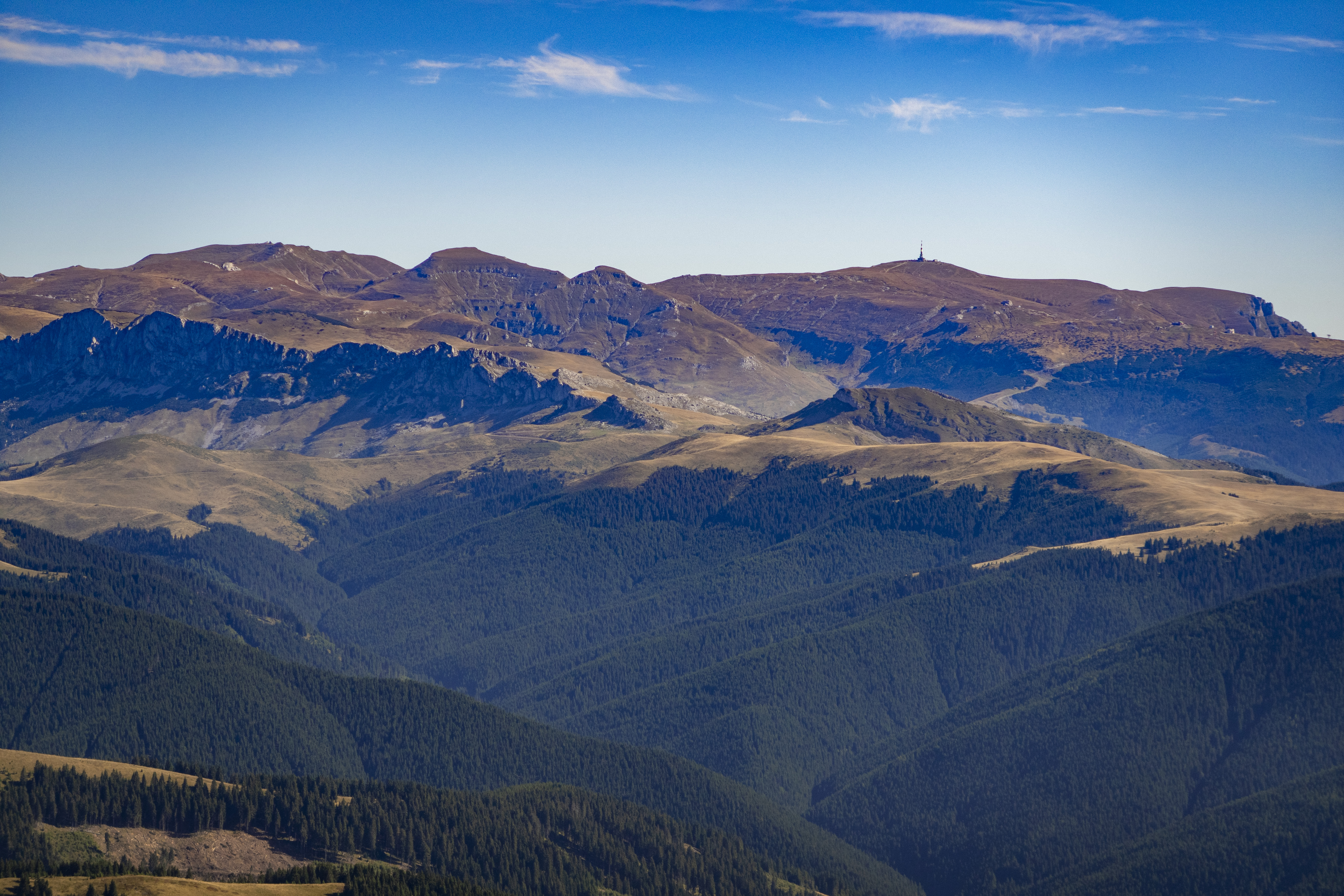

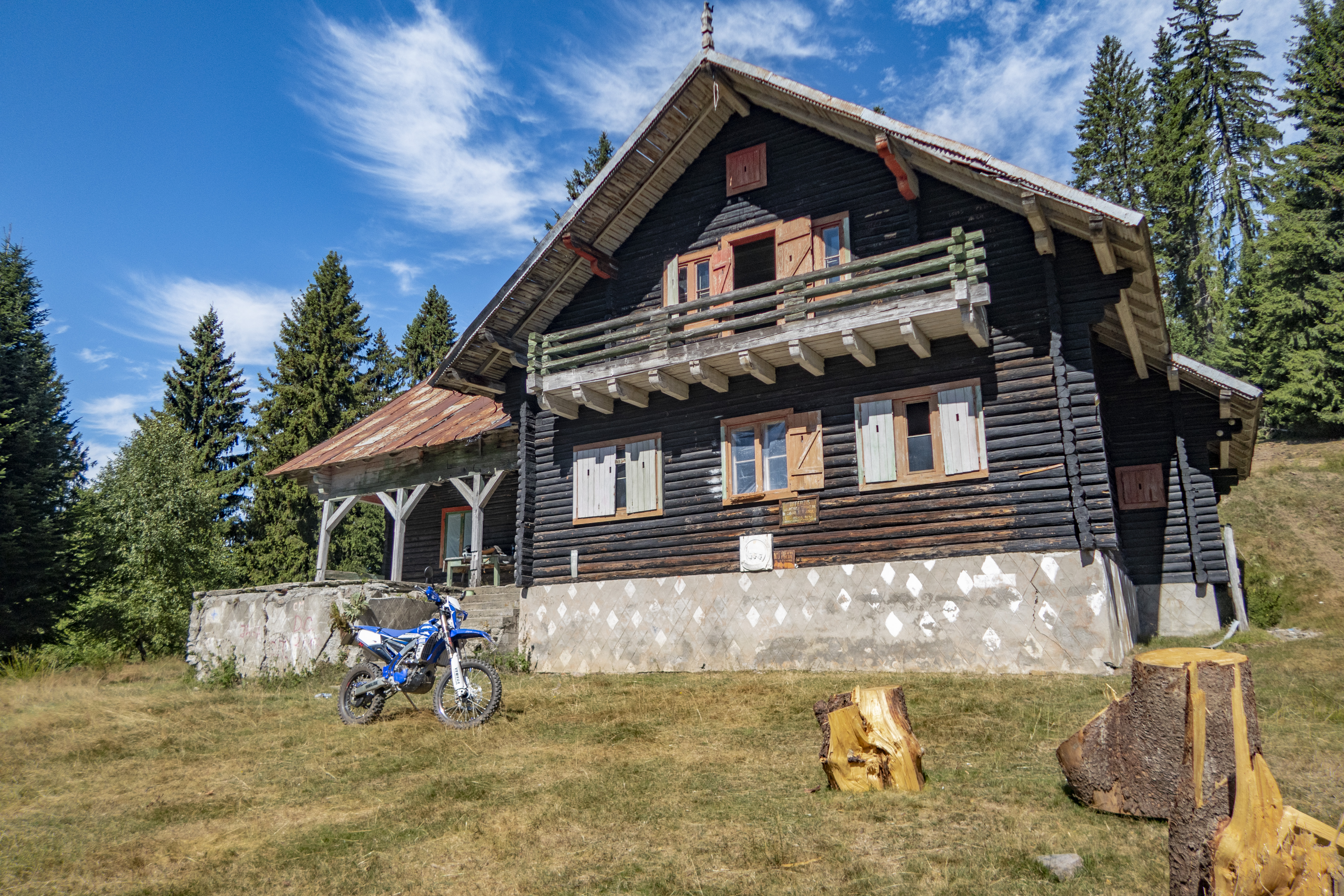

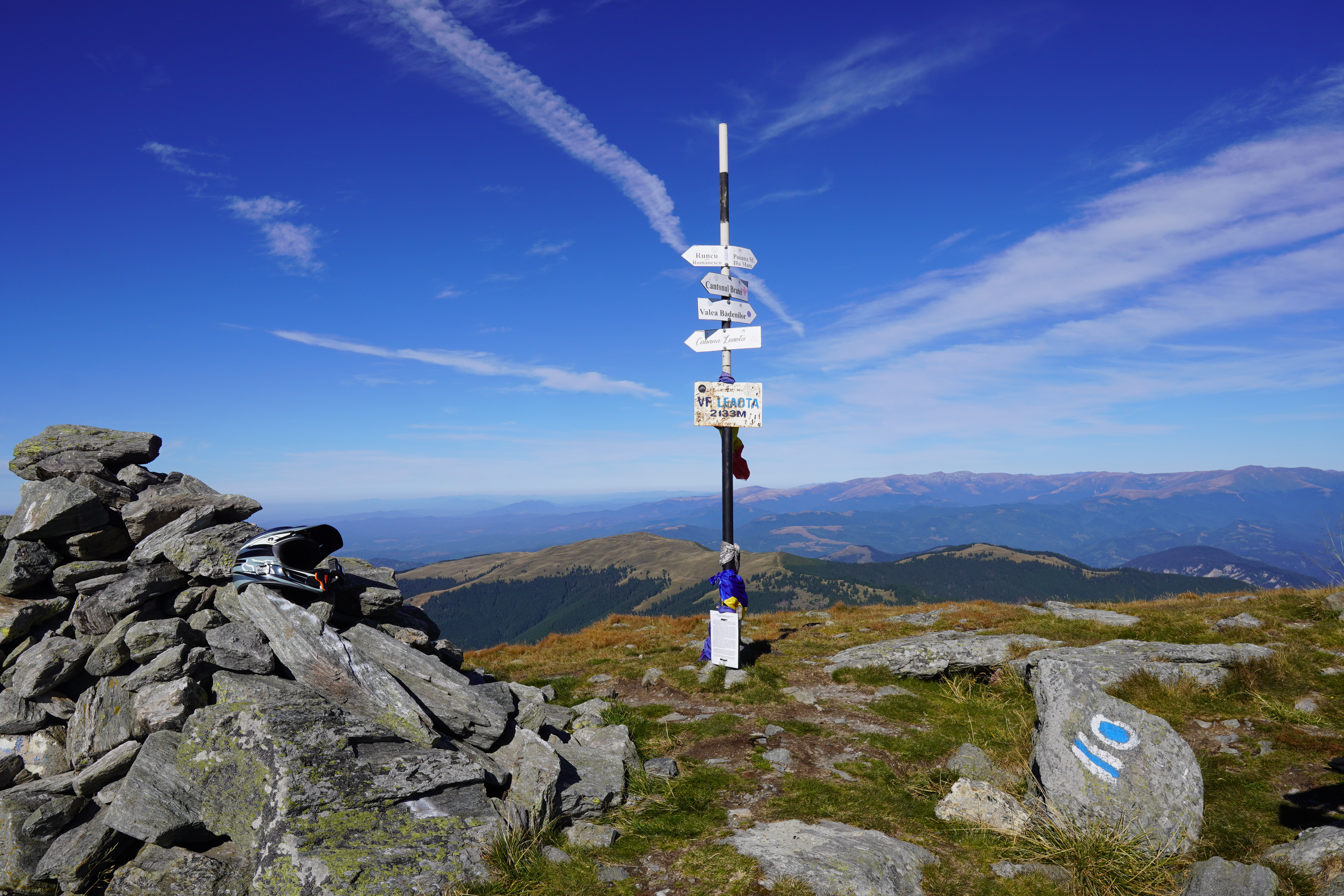
