= Birds of the Danube Delta =

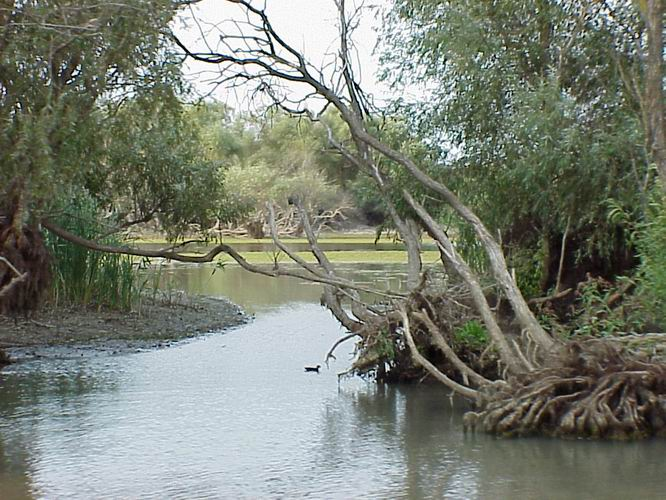
Image from the Danube Delta

Following an almost two-decade (1951–1970) research of the Danube Delta territory, 274 bird species were identified, of which 176 were brooding (sedentary and migratory) and 98 non-brooding ones (winter, passage, erratic, and accidental birds).

== Brooding birds ==
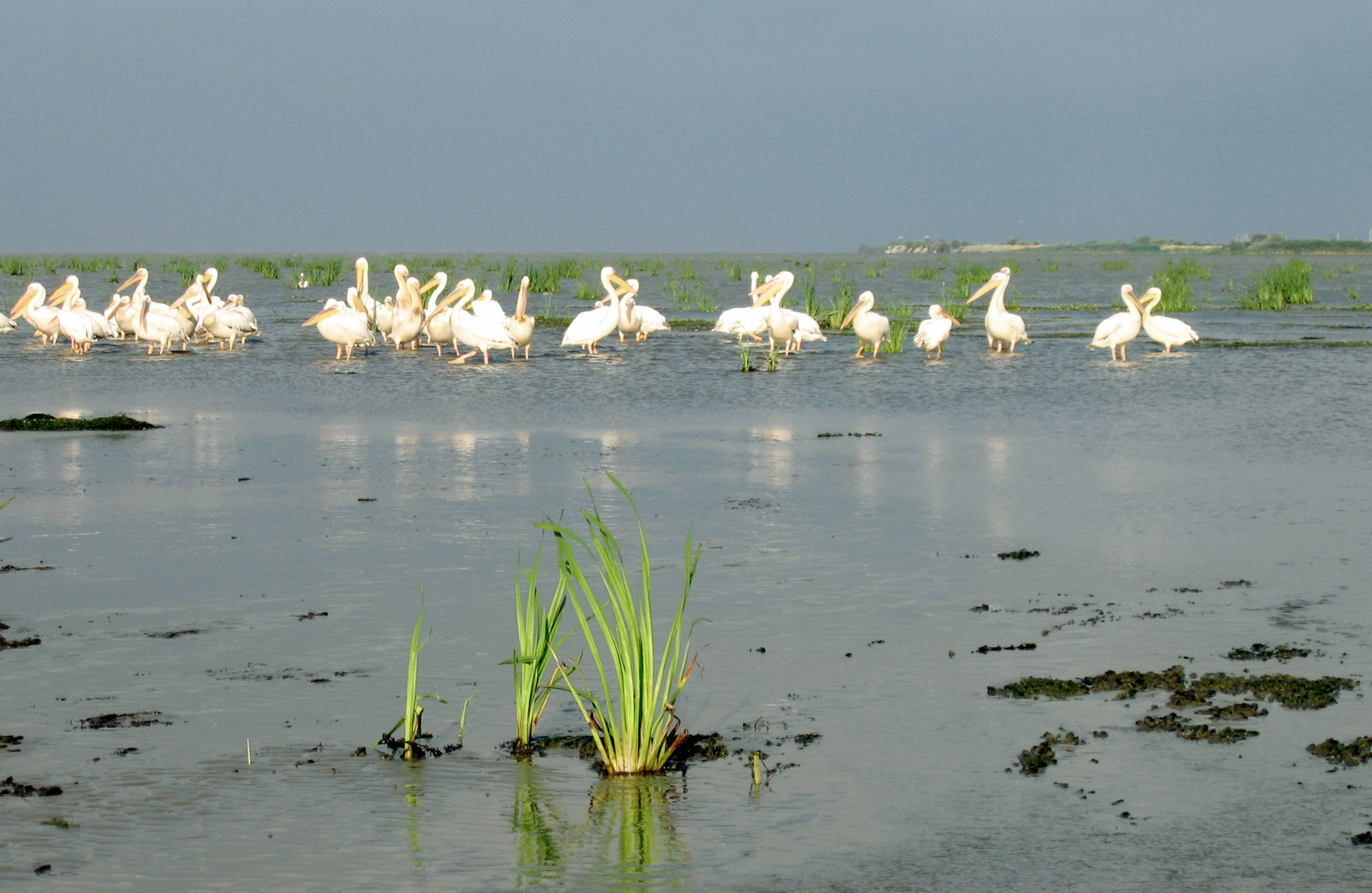
Pelicans in the Danube delta

The species of brooding birds occurring in the Danube Delta were classified into 12 main biotopes, the classification criterion being represented by the nesting place where they show the greatest relative density.

As to their dynamics, the brooding birds include: 44 sedentary species and 132 migratory ones. The great number of migratory species is explained by the optimal conditions of nesting and especially of feeding the deltaic biotopes are providing in the warm season of the year. This phenomenon is also supported by the presence – in different deltaic biotopes as against the common ones – of some species, which in the rest of their area cover other life environments.

== Non-breeding birds ==
The species of non-brooding deltaic birds were classified into the biotopes they visit while resting on the Danube Delta's territory and they are connected to by the way these biotopes are providing their food. The ornithological biotopes of the Danube Delta belong to three well-individualized habitats, namely the aquatic, the amphibian and the terrestrial ones.

The non-brooding species include: 35 winter species visit the Danube Delta only in winter; 46 passage species which cross the delta's territory only in spring and in autumn; 6 erratic ones which irregularly show up in different biotopes and 11 accidental species.

The number of biotopes increases from the aquatic to the terrestrial environment, while their dimensions follow an inverse proportionality, as they are smaller in the terrestrial and larger in the amphibian and aquatic environments.

== Geographical origin ==
According to their geographical origin, the delta birds contain the following types: arctic species (27); Siberian (32); European (108); Mediterranean (29); Mongolian (33); Chinese (2). The transpalearctic type contains 43 species. For Romania's latitude – delta included – the north-originating species (Arctic and Siberian) appear as winter-and passage birds, while the south-originating species (European, Mediterranean and Mongolian) are met with as sedentary and summer species.

Further comments upon the manner birds migrate - namely the causes, which start on migration - and upon the way they orient themselves during migration, resulted in the hypothesis of the "inner time" and "inner space", which, along with their known senses, allow the migratory birds to perfect the migratory act in time and space.

An interesting ethologic aspect appearing enhanced by the conditions of the Danube Delta (especially by the floods) is represented by egg laying in common nests. Thus, as a consequence of the general lack of egg-laying places, especially at flood time when a great part of the aquatic-species nests are flooded, the birds this way affected go on laying eggs in alien nests either belonging to the same species or to species of the same families.

The following up of the tropic regime of the deltaic birds according to its origin had in view to know the food cycles, especially as final production represented by birds, the classification of these latter in categories with aquatic, mixed and respectively terrestrial nutritive regimes. In this respect, the delta birds appear as having a trophic regime of predominantly aquatic origin owing to the huge quantity the nutritive biomass of this milieu is produced in the Danube Delta in the warm season of the year.

While the sedentary species generally close their trophic chains at the delta's level, the migratory, the passage, and the wintertime species annually carry away from the Danube Delta a great part of the nutritive biomass accumulated while resting in this territory. As far as the habitats are concerned, the species of the aquatic ones almost exclusivity feed from the aquatic millennium, while those living in the terrestrial habitat hardly have 50 per cent terrestrial food, the remainder having a mixed and aquatic origin. Many species owe their presence or existence in the delta – in rather high densities as compared to the rest of the area – just to this food richness.

The contrast created between the great food abundance available as compared to the existence for some species of plenty of sites for nest location resulted in the simple and mixed form of colonial nesting. Such an observation and interpretation of the colonial nesting origin in the Danube Delta may constitute an argument for properly explaining the colonial nesting phenomenon in different regions of the globe.
