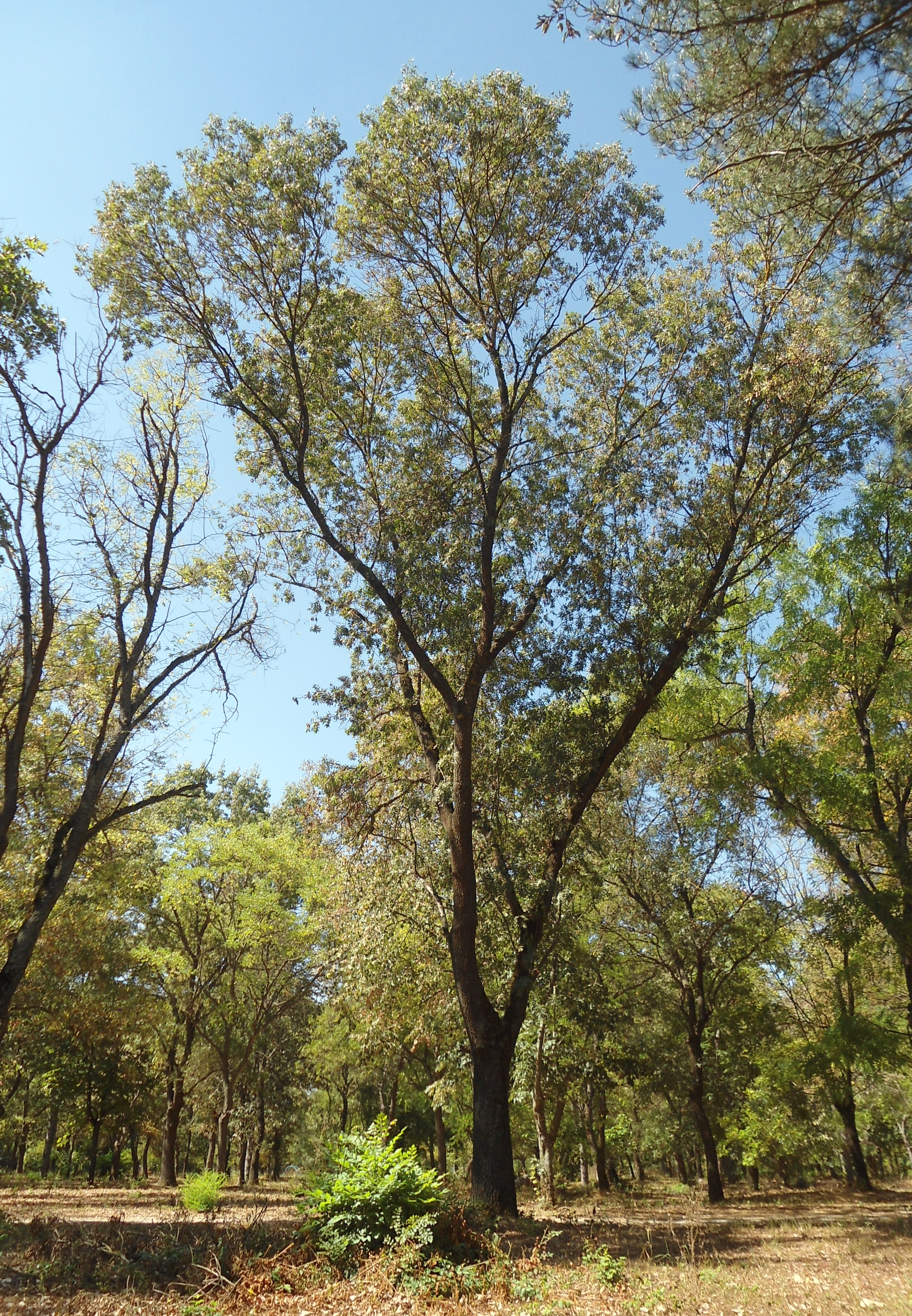

Scientific classification
- Kingdom: Plantae
- Clade: Tracheophytes
- Clade: Angiosperms
- Clade: Eudicots
- Clade: Asterids
- Order: Lamiales
- Family: Oleaceae
- Genus: Fraxinus
- Species: F. pallisiae

Binomial name
- Fraxinus pallisiae Wilmott

= Fraxinus pallisiae =

Species of flowering plant

Fraxinus pallisiae is a species of flowering plant belonging to the family Oleaceae.

Its native range is Southeastern Europe to Moldova, Caucasus.

== Gallery ==
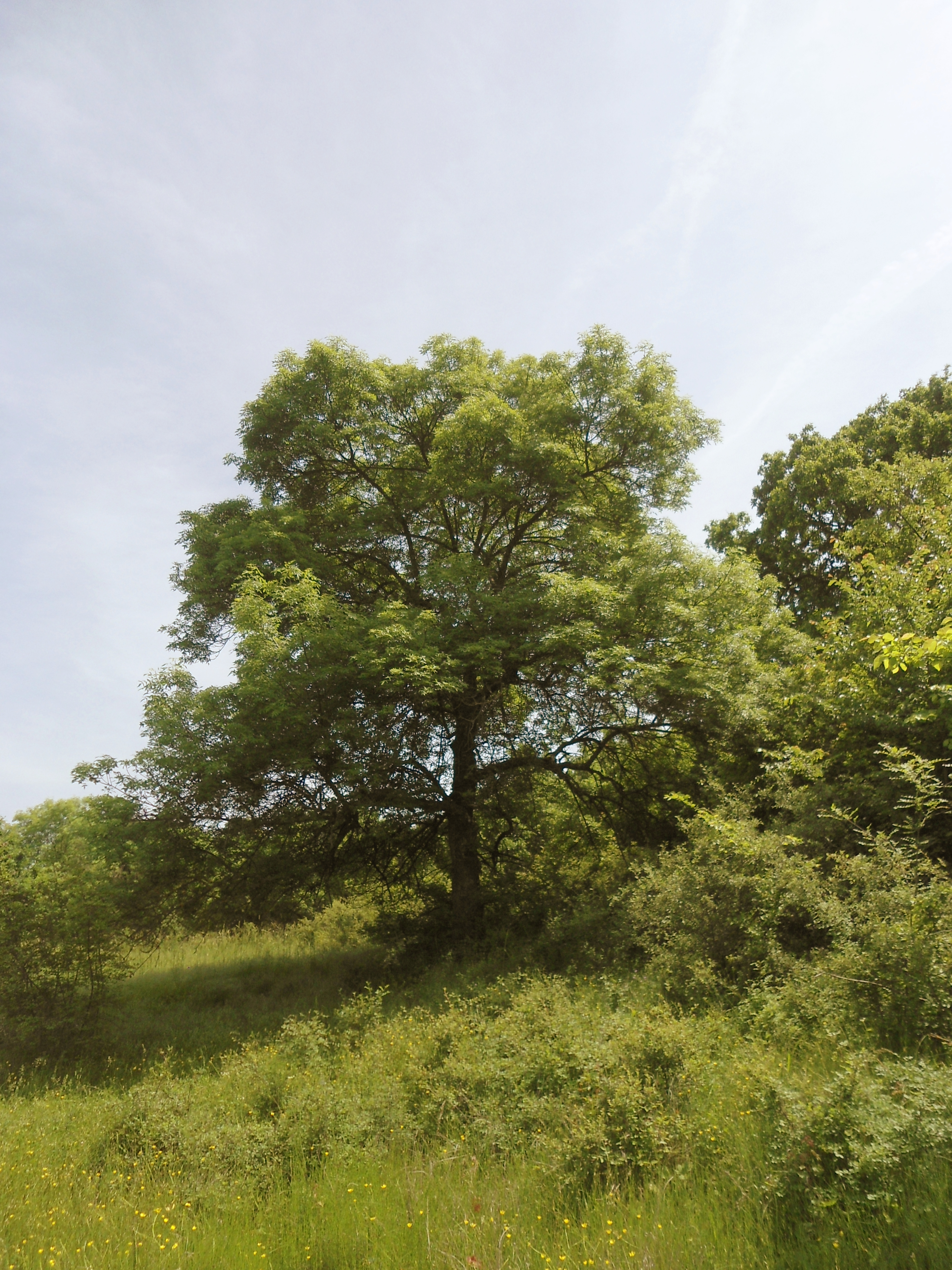
Tree

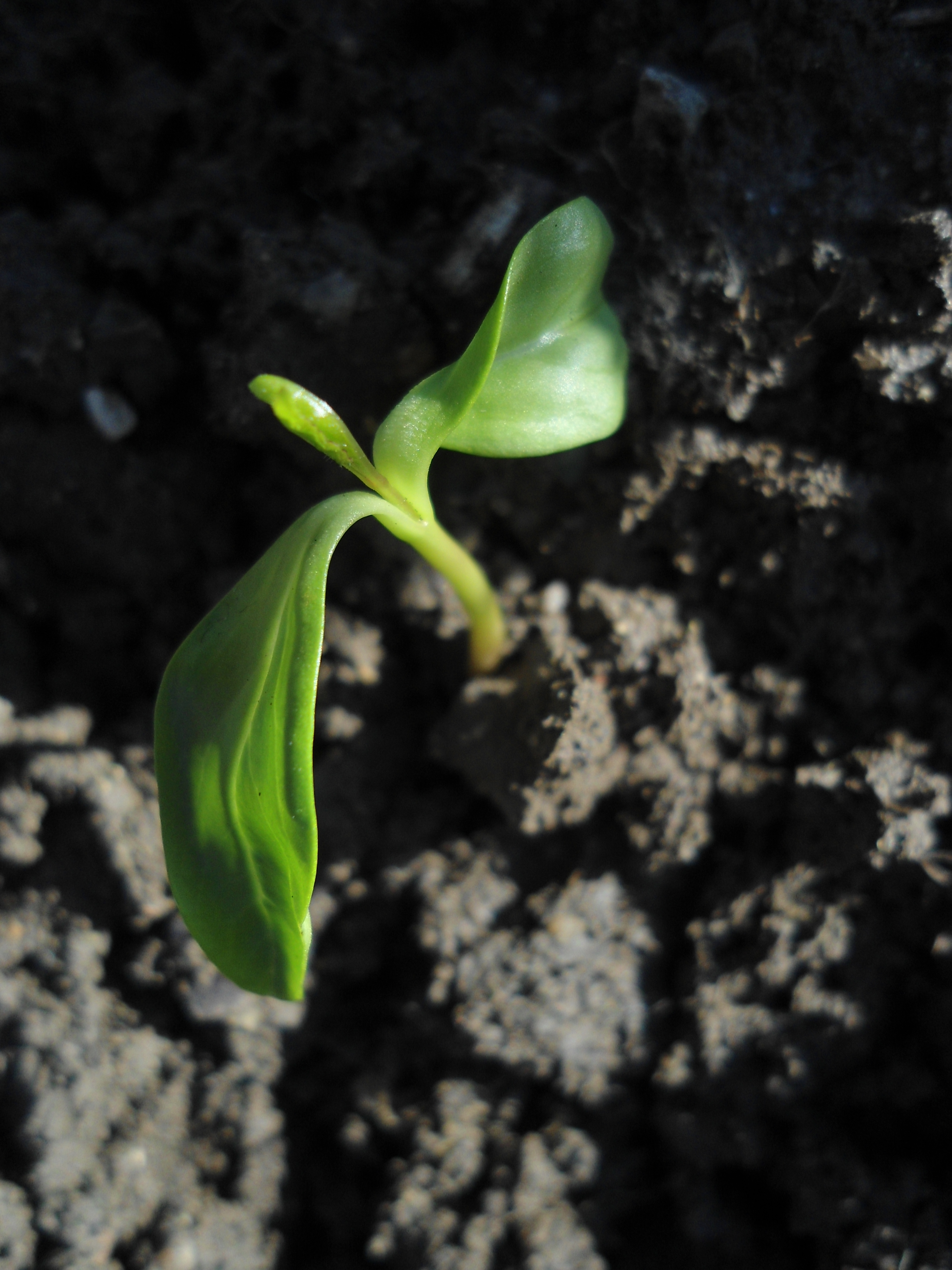
Cotyledons

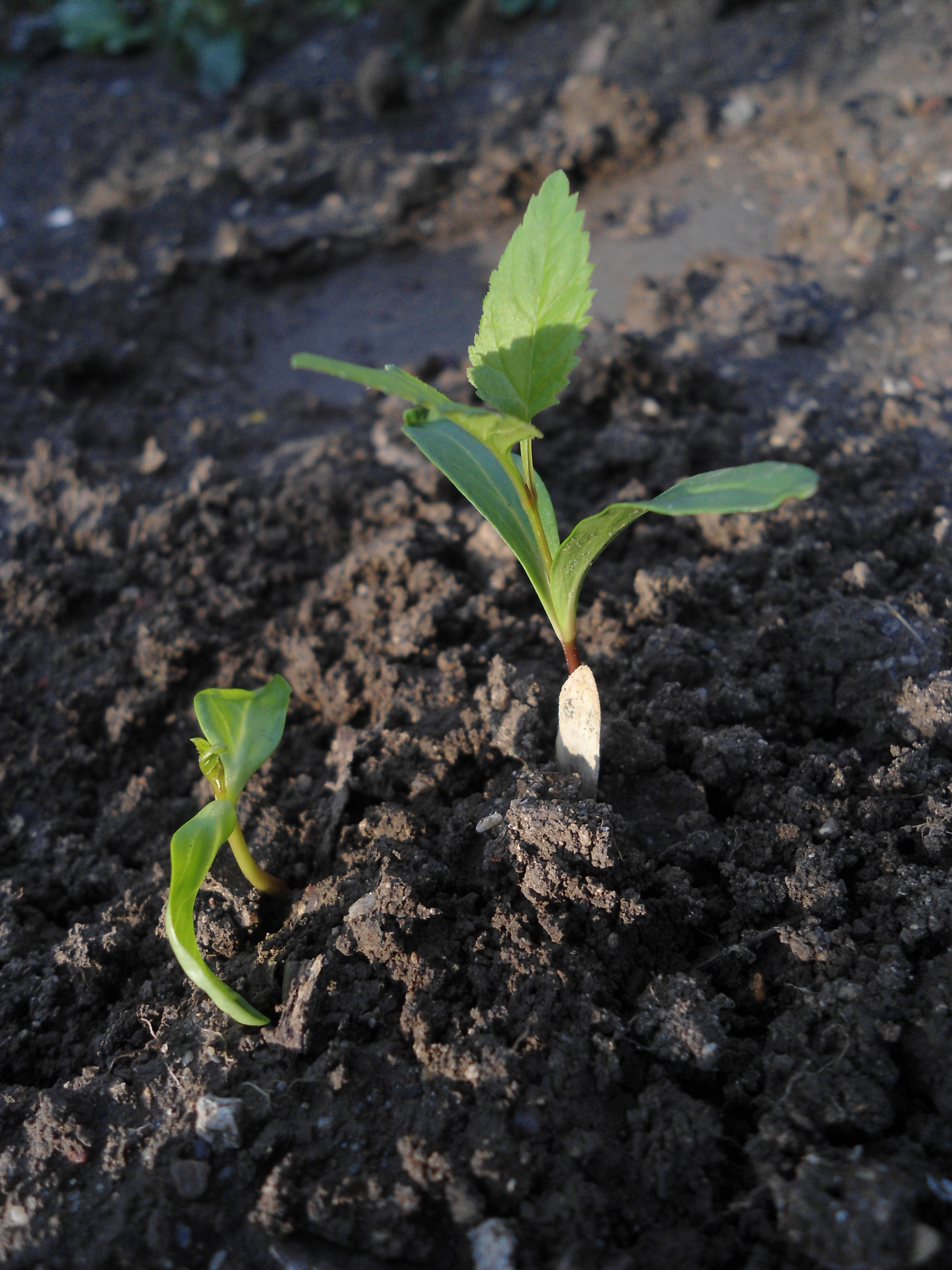
Seedling

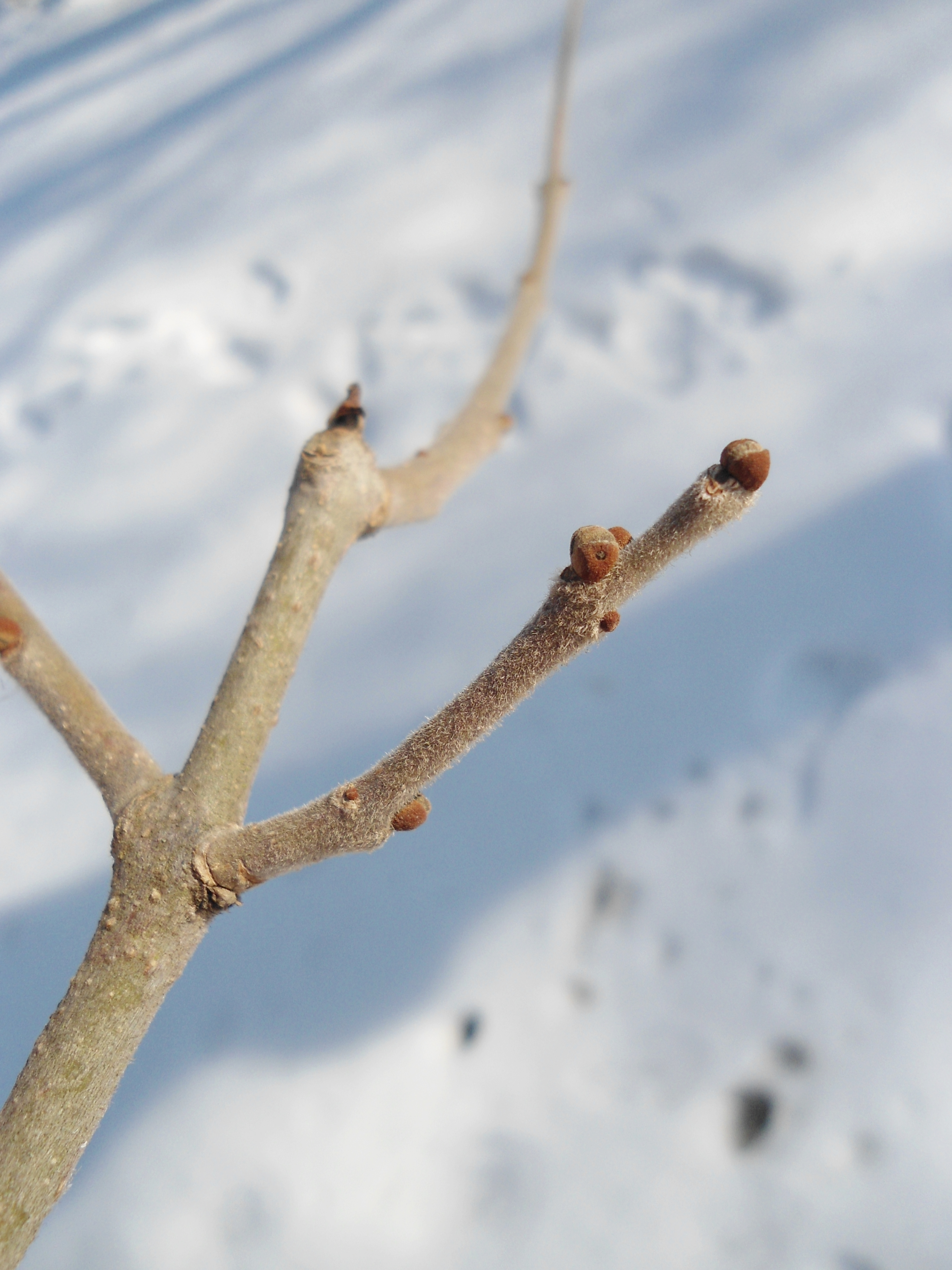
Stem

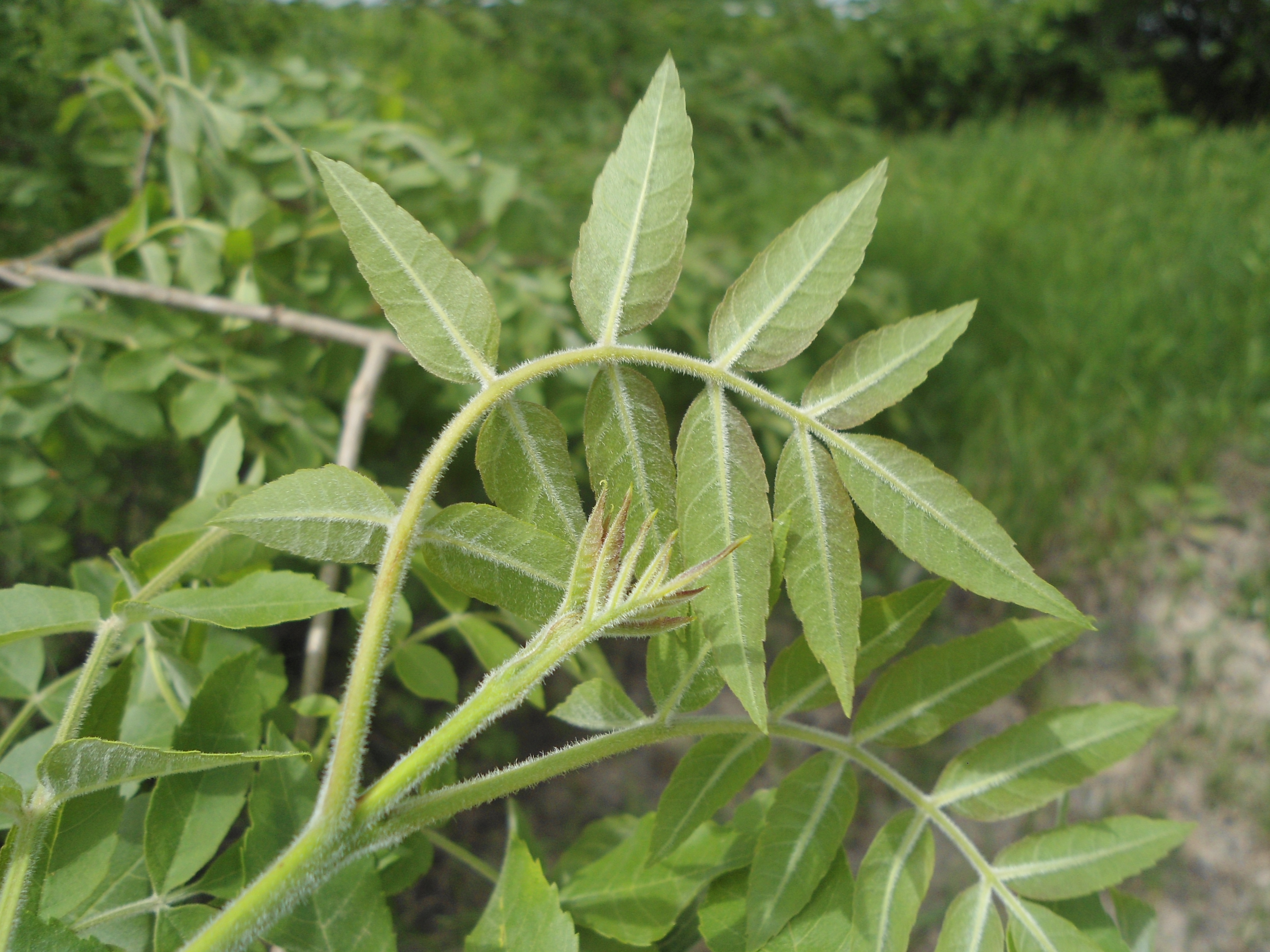
New leaves

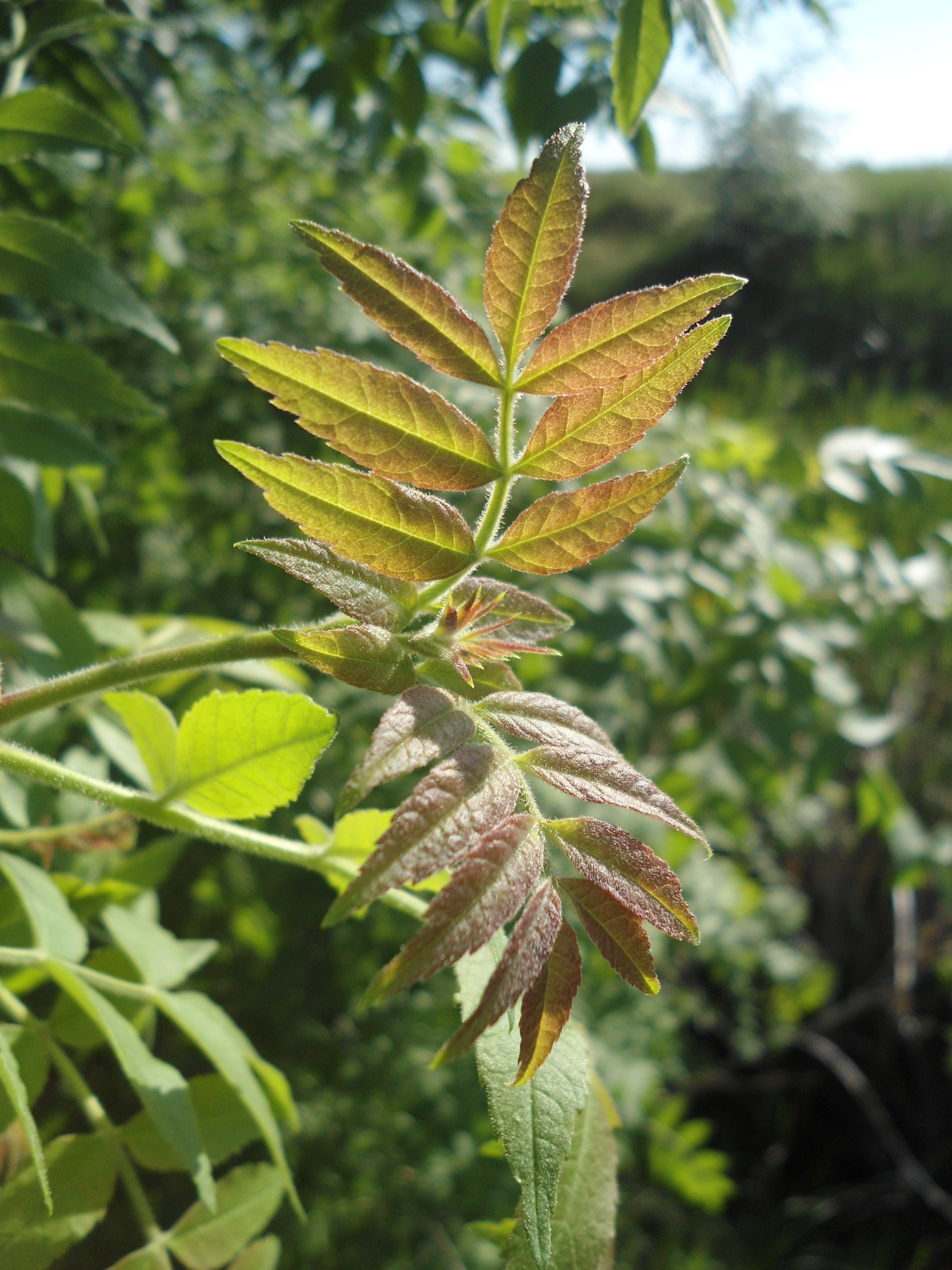
Young leaves

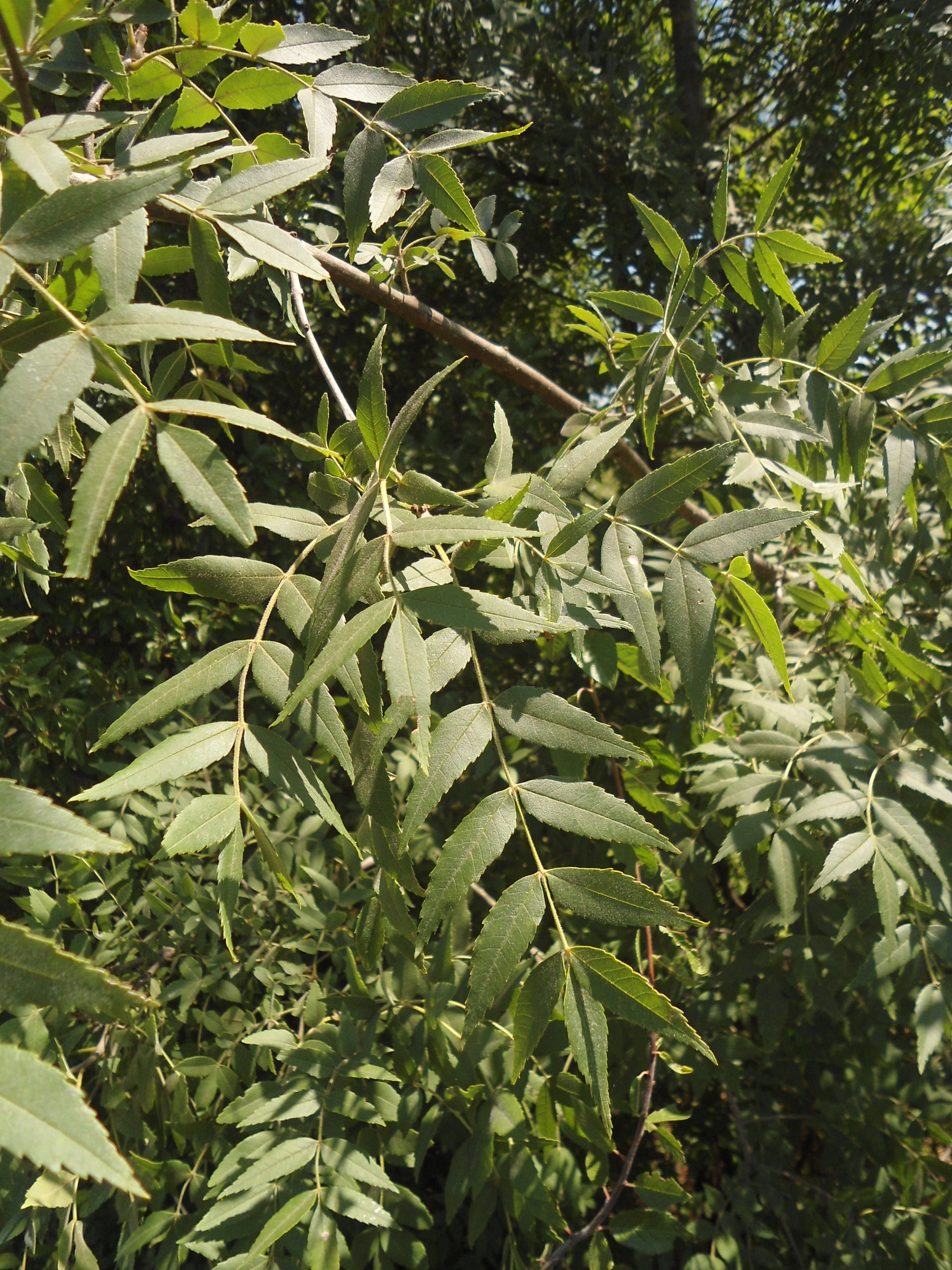
Mature leaves

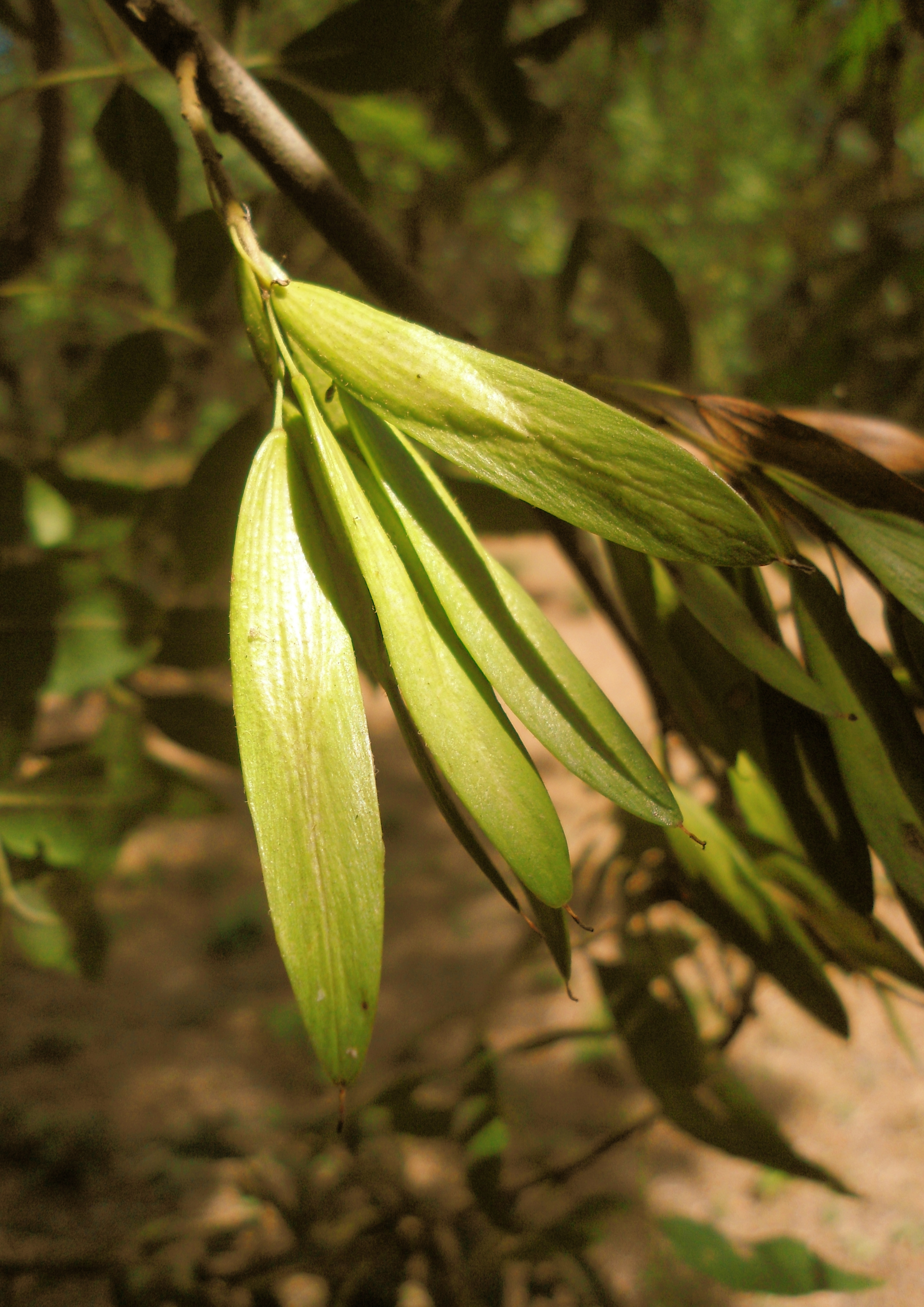
Fruit

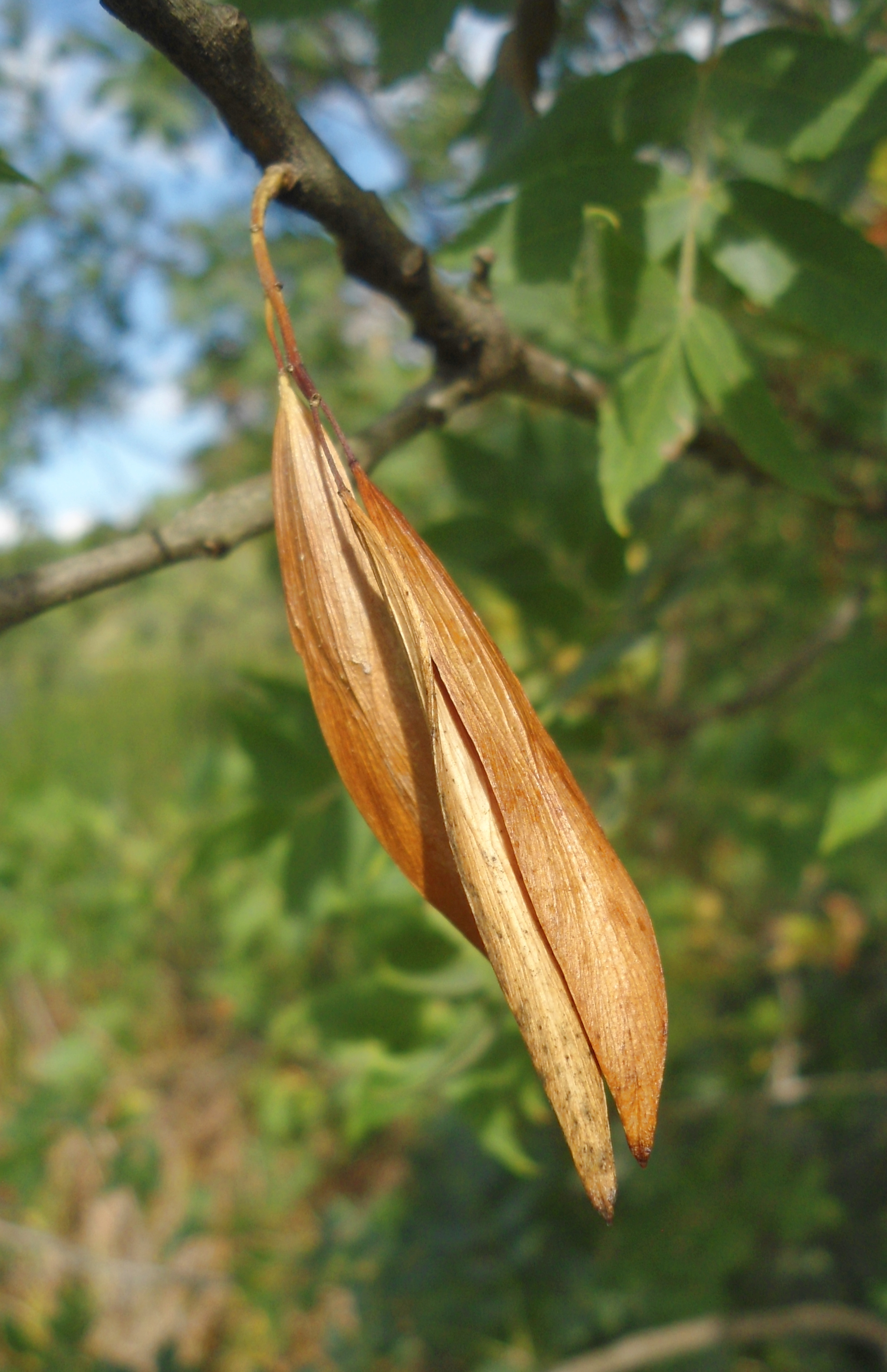
Dehiscent fruit
