= Slănic (Bratia) =

- Location within Romania

Location
- Country: Romania
- Counties: Argeș County
- Villages: Slănic, Broșteni

Physical characteristics
- Source: Iezer Mountains
- Mouth: Bratia
  - location: Vlădești
  - coordinates: 45.1805°N 24.9217°E
- Length: 17 km (11 mi)
- Basin size: 47 km^{2} (18 sq mi)

Basin features
- Progression: Bratia→ Râul Târgului→ Râul Doamnei→ Argeș→ Danube→ Black Sea

The Slănic is a right tributary of the Bratia in Romania. It flows into the Bratia in Vlădești. Its length is 17 km (11 mi) and its basin size is 47 km^{2} (18 sq mi).
