= Râușor =

Râușor or Râușorul may refer to the following places in Romania:

- Râușor, a village in the commune Mândra, Brașov County
- Râușor Dam, a dam in Argeș County
- Râușor, a tributary of the Băiaș in Vâlcea County
- Râușor (Bratia), a tributary of the Bratia in Argeș County
- Râușor (Breazova), a river in Hunedoara County
- Râușor (Dâmbovița), a tributary of the Dâmbovița in Argeș County
- Râușor, a tributary of the Lungșoara in Sibiu County
- Râușor (Mara), a river in Maramureș County
- Râușor (Râul Târgului), a tributary of the Râul Târgului in Argeș County
- Râușor (Strei), a river in Hunedoara County
