= Bughea (Râul Târgului) =

- Location within Romania

Location
- Country: Romania
- Counties: Argeș County
- Villages: Bughea de Sus, Bughea de Jos, Godeni, Cotești, Capu Piscului

Physical characteristics
- Source: Iezer Mountains
- Mouth: Râul Târgului
  - location: Furnicoși
  - coordinates: 45.1335°N 24.9966°E
- Length: 33 km (21 mi)
- Basin size: 96 km^{2} (37 sq mi)

Basin features
- Progression: Râul Târgului→ Râul Doamnei→ Argeș→ Danube→ Black Sea
- Tributaries
  - left: Izvorul Zănoaga
  - right: Izvorul Dragoșu

The Bughea is a right tributary of the Râul Târgului in Romania. Its two source rivers (Izvorul Zănoaga and Izvorul Dragoșu) originate in the Iezer Mountains. It flows into the Râul Târgului near Mihăești. Its length is 33 km (21 mi) and its basin size is 96 km^{2} (37 sq mi).
