= Râușor (Bratia) =

- Location within Romania

Location
- Country: Romania
- Counties: Argeș County

Physical characteristics
- Source: Iezer Mountains
- Mouth: Bratia
  - coordinates: 45.2647°N 24.9349°E
- Length: 19 km (12 mi)
- Basin size: 61 km^{2} (24 sq mi)

Basin features
- Progression: Bratia→ Râul Târgului→ Râul Doamnei→ Argeș→ Danube→ Black Sea
- Tributaries
  - left: Coșa

The Râușor is a right tributary of the river Bratia in Romania. It flows into the Bratia in the village Gămăcești. Its length is 19 km (12 mi) and its basin size is 61 km^{2} (24 sq mi).
