= Albeștii de Muscel =

- Commune
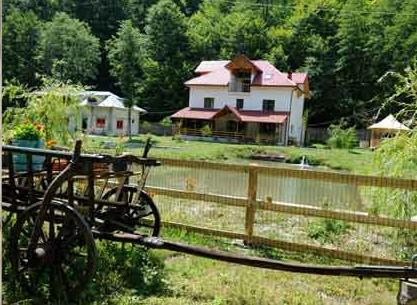
- Brătioara trout farm

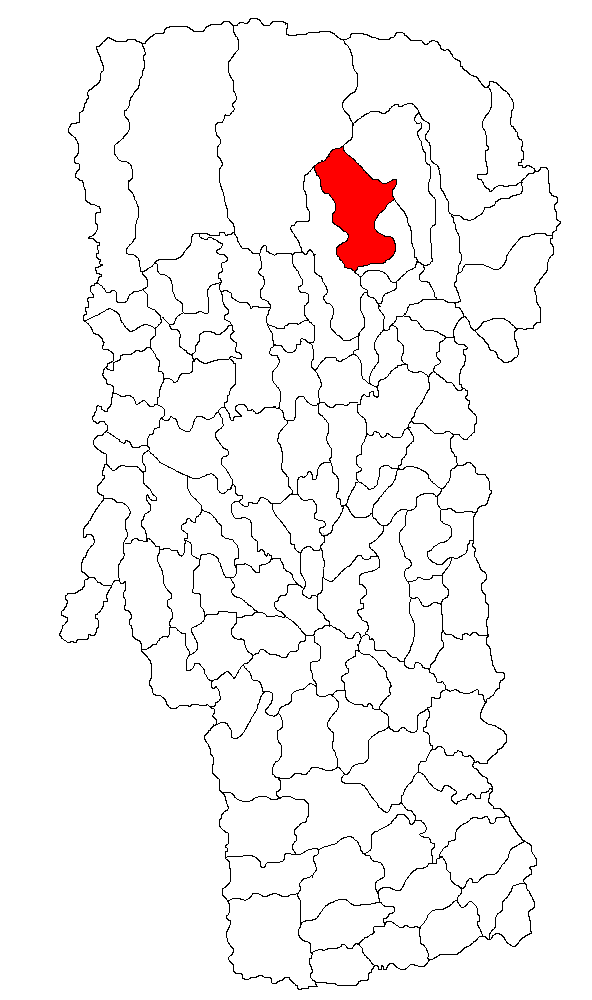
- Location in Argeș County

- Location in Romania
- Coordinates: 45°19′N 25°00′E
- Country: Romania
- County: Argeș

Government
  - Mayor (2020–2024): Cătălin Manta (PNL)
- Area: 122.97 km^{2} (47.48 sq mi)
- Elevation: 730 m (2,400 ft)
- Population (2021-12-01): 1,345
  - Density: 10.94/km^{2} (28.33/sq mi)
- Time zone: UTC+02:00 (EET)
  - Summer (DST): UTC+03:00 (EEST)
- Postal code: 117026
- Area code: +(40) 248
- Vehicle reg.: AG
- Website: primariaalbestiidemuscel.ro

Albeștii de Muscel is a commune in Argeș County, Muntenia, Romania. It is composed of two villages, Albești (the commune centre) and Cândești. It also included Bughea de Sus village, the former commune centre, until 2004, when it was split off to form Bughea de Sus Commune.

The commune is located 8 km (5 mi) northwest of Câmpulung, at the foot of the Iezer Mountains. The Bratia River has its source in Cândești.

Historical population
Year	Pop.	±%
2002	1,708	—
2011	1,578	−7.6%
2021	1,345	−14.8%
Source: Census data

== Natives ==
- Patriarch Iustin of Romania (1910–1986), Patriarch of the Romanian Orthodox Church from 1977 to 1986
