= Bătrâna (Râul Târgului) =

- Location within Romania

Location
- Country: Romania
- Counties: Argeș County

Physical characteristics
- Source: Iezer Mountains
- Mouth: Râul Târgului
  - coordinates: 45.4477°N 25.0404°E
- Length: 9 km (5.6 mi)
- Basin size: 33 km^{2} (13 sq mi)

Basin features
- Progression: Râul Târgului→ Râul Doamnei→ Argeș→ Danube→ Black Sea
- Tributaries
  - right: Iezerul Mare, Iezerul

The Bătrâna is a right tributary of the Râul Târgului in Romania. Its source is near the Bătrâna Peak, in the Iezer Mountains. Its length is 9 km (5.6 mi) and its basin size is 33 km^{2} (13 sq mi).
