= Patriarch Iustin of Romania =

Patriarch of Romania from 1977 to 1986

His Beatitude Iustin
- By God's mercy, Archbishop of Bucharest, Metropolitan of Ungro-Vlachia, Locum tenens of the throne of Caesarea Cappadociae and Patriarch of All Romania
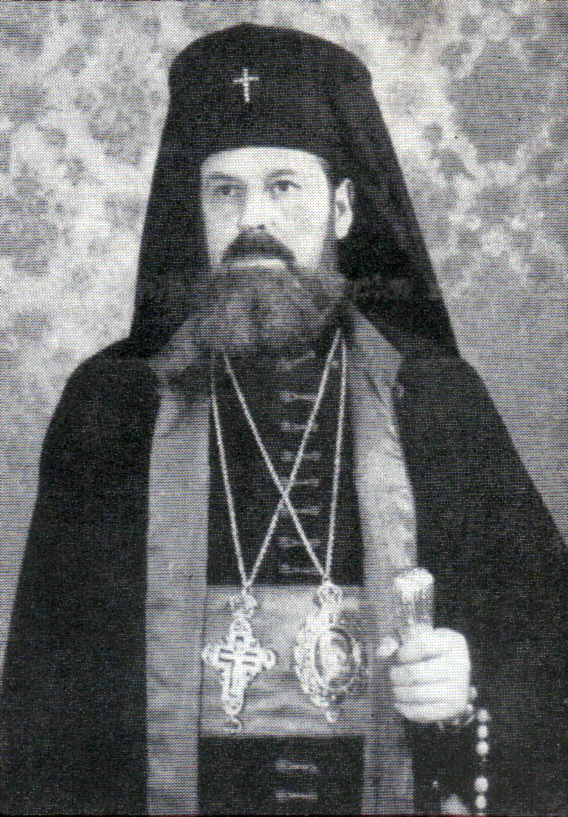
- Church: Romanian Orthodox Church
- See: Bucharest
- Installed: 12 June 1977
- Term ended: 31 July 1986
- Predecessor: Patriarch Justinian of Romania
- Successor: Patriarch Teoctist of Romania

Personal details
- Born: 5 March 1910 Cândești
- Died: 31 July 1986 (aged 76) Bucharest
- Buried: Romanian Patriarchal Cathedral
- Denomination: Eastern Orthodox

Member of the Great National Assembly of the Socialist Republic of Romania
- In office 1957–1986

Personal details
- Party: Iron Guard (before 1941); Front of Socialist Unity and Democracy (1968–1986)

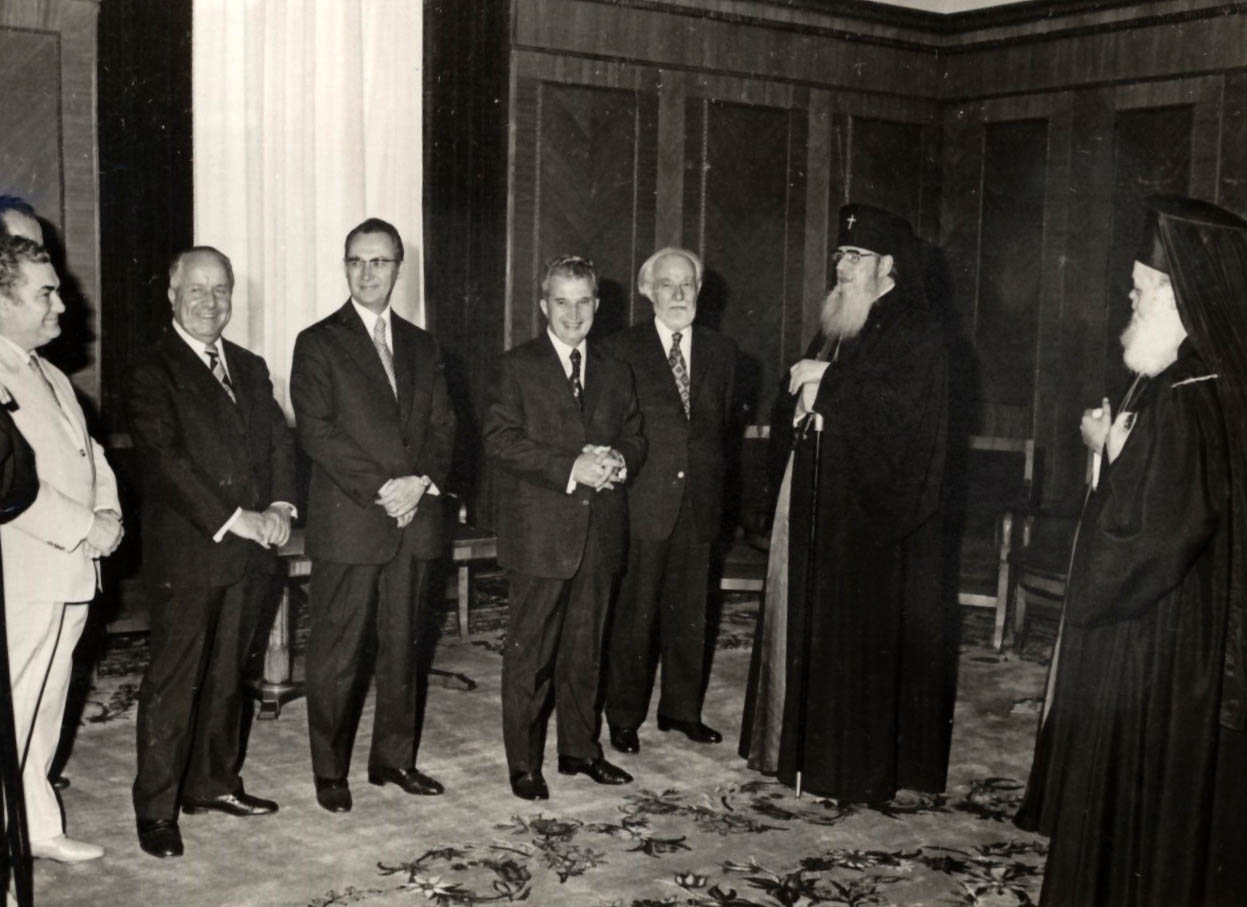
Nicolae Ceaușescu meeting Justin Moisescu, after he was elected patriarch of the Orthodox Church of Romania

Iustin Moisescu (Romanian pronunciation: [jusˈtin mo.iˈsesku]; March 5, 1910 – July 31, 1986) was Patriarch of the Romanian Orthodox Church from 1977 to 1986.

== Biography ==
=== Theological preparation ===
Moisescu was born in Cândești, Argeș County. He studied at the war orphans' seminary in Câmpulung-Muscel from 1922 to 1930, finishing with top honours. Patriarch Miron Cristea selected him alone, of all 1930 seminary graduates, to receive a scholarship and take his licentiate in theology at the University of Athens. In 1934, he returned to Romania, having received a degree "arista" (magna cum laude).

Cristea, following Moisescu's progress, sent him (upon the recommendation of the University of Athens and of the Romanian Embassy in Greece) to continue his advanced studies at the Faculty of Roman Catholic Theology at the Université des Sciences Humaines in Strasbourg. After two years in France (1934–36), having obtained material for his doctoral thesis, he returned to Athens in 1936. The following year he obtained his doctorate with the Greek-language thesis "Evagrius Ponticus. Life, writings and teachings", which received an award from the Athens Academy of Sciences. He then took equivalence examinations at the University of Bucharest's Faculty of Theology.

There followed a quick succession of professorates, with rapid promotion: Professor of Latin at Bucharest's Nifon Seminary (1937–38); New Testament Professor at the University of Warsaw's Faculty of Orthodox Theology (1938–39), where he replaced the celebrated professor Nicolae Arseniev. In Warsaw, he established the following Polish-language courses: "General and specific introduction to the holy books of the New Testament"; "Exegesis of Saint Paul's Epistle to the Galatians"; and "Exegesis of the prologue to the Gospel of John". These courses were examined by professors Milan Șesan and Vladimir Prelipceanu, who "determined their scientific and didactic value, as well as their full harmony with the teachings of the Orthodox Church". During this time, he was also a member of the Iron Guard.

In 1940, he was named associate professor. In 1942, after an examination, he was named Professor of New Testament Exegesis at the Cernăuţi-Suceava Faculty of Theology. At Cernăuți and Suceava he created three more courses: "Introduction to the holy books of the New Testament", "Exegesis" and "Biblical hermeneutics". About his Romanian-language writings, the same report notes that "The author's form of expression in Romanian is distinguished by conciseness and clarity". In 1946 he was transferred as professor to the same department at the Faculty of Theology in Bucharest; in 1948, he began teaching at the Bucharest Theological Institute. During his time as a theology professor, he published a number of specialised works.

=== Metropolitan of Transylvania ===
Another series of promotions followed after a turn unforeseen by many at the time, but in the best tradition of precedents not only Byzantine, but also Eastern European and even Romanian, especially Transylvanian: witness Photius' elevation to Patriarch of Constantinople from general, Ambrose becoming Bishop of Milan from civil administrator, professor Nicolae Bălan becoming Metropolitan of Transylvania, etc. On February 23, 1956, Vicar Bishop Teoctist Arăpașu ordained him deacon; the next day, the other Patriarchal Vicar Bishop, Antim Nica, ordained him priest, and on February 26, the National Church Council, gathered in electoral college according to its statute's provisions, elected him Archbishop of Sibiu and Metropolitan of Transylvania. He replaced the eminent and recently deceased Nicolae Bălan.

He then spent ten days in meditation before asking God to receive him into the ranks of the monks at Cernica Monastery on March 8, 1956. Already elected metropolitan, on March 15, 1956 Patriarch Justinian, Metropolitan Firmilian of Oltenia and Bishop Nicolae Colan of Cluj ordained him into the episcopate. Three days later, in the Sibiu Metropolitan Cathedral, he was given Andrei Șaguna's crozier. During his short stay in Sibiu, among other activities, he founded the theological magazine Mitropolia Ardealului (nr. 1–2, Sep–Oct 1956) in place of the defunct Revista Teologică.

Before Moisescu's election as Metropolitan of Transylvania, Patriarch Justinian, in a speech before the electoral college, described thus the candidate who should be elected: "There we will have to send the best of today's clerics from our Church, a vigorously well-rounded personality, with a distinguished theological preparation, thoroughly aware of all the problems that our contemporary world presents", for "new times require new people".

=== Metropolitan of Moldavia and Suceava ===
Metropolitan Iustin spent only a short time at Sibiu. On January 10, 1957, he was elected Metropolitan of Moldavia and Suceava, and three days later he was installed in the seat once held by Dosoftei, Varlaam, Veniamin Costache, to name only the most prominent of his predecessors at Iași.

Upon his election as Metropolitan of Moldavia and Suceava, he described his programme thus: "With all my efforts I will undertake with steadfast resolve to protect and keep the Holy places: churches, monasteries and sketes – glorious works of art – that form the diadem of the Metropolitanate of Moldavia; and for those who need these treasures of our ancient faith, I will strive to produce priests who are hard-working and devoted to the Church, the Fatherland and the good of the people. Unceasingly I shall keep watch over the direction my Diocese's priests are taking, for the complete fulfillment of its duties toward the Church and the Fatherland. I will ensure as far as possible that the fruits of priestly work will be seen in the good administration of our places of worship, in the preaching of love among all the sons of the Fatherland and in the charitable giving for the popular good".

On February 3, 1957, Metropolitan Iustin was first elected deputy to the Great National Assembly, representing Hârlău. He would be elected six more times, sitting until his death.

As Metropolitan of Moldavia, he undertook numerous activities. New buildings – veritable architectural monuments – were erected on the grounds of the Iași diocesan centre, while his Cathedral and residence were redone. Numerous monasteries and churches, the diocese's historic monuments, were also restored. Museums or museum collections associated with these monuments were started for many of them. New buildings were raised at the Neamț Monastery Theological Seminary, and the old ones were modernised.

In Moldavia, along with his numerous travels and external cares, he initiated, the radical transformation of the Metropolitan Centre from a random assortment of run-down buildings into a modern centre fit for his time. Also, he had constructed, under conditions of Communism, three large buildings in the diocesan centre (two administrative buildings and a dormitory for priests), over 70 new churches and chapels, 52 parish houses and five archpriests' residences. He founded ten museums of ecclesiastical art, having obtained funds from the state and from parishioners' donations. He restored, in full or in part, over twenty monasteries and sketes: Putna, Sucevița, Moldovița, Voroneț, Arbore, Humor, Slatina, Dobrovăț, Cetățuia, Râșca, Neamț, Sihăstria, Secu, Bistrița, Văratec.

He led several Romanian Orthodox delegations visiting other churches and countries: the Church of England (1958), the Malabar Syriac Church (1961), the United States (1970), the Danish National Church (1971) and the Ecumenical Patriarchate (1974). He took part in several synodal delegations led by Patriarch Justinian and received numerous foreign delegations at Iaşi or within the Iaşi Archdiocese. As a member of the Central Committee of the World Council of Churches (1961–77), he participated in general congresses at New Delhi (1961), Uppsala (1969) and Nairobi (1975) as well as at the annual sessions of the Central Committee at Paris (1962), Geneva (1966, 1973 and 1976), Heraklion (1967), Canterbury (1969), Addis Ababa (1971), Utrecht (1972), Berlin (1974), etc.

He was part of the Presidium of the Conference of European Churches and of its Consultative Committee, participating in the Nyborg IV (1964), Nyborg V (1966), Nyborg VI (1971) and Engelberg (1974) General Assemblies, as well as at sessions of the Presidium and the Consultative Committee. He led delegations of the Romanian Orthodox Church to pan-Orthodox conferences at Rhodes (1961, 1963, 1964) and Chambesy (1968), and to the first preparatory conference of the Holy and Great Pan-Orthodox Synod (Chambesy, 1971).

As metropolitan, he published numerous articles, pastoral letters, speeches and editorials, especially in the magazine Mitropolia Moldovei și Sucevei, which appeared for twenty years under his direct supervision. In addition, the Iaşi Metropolitan Centre edited other works, among them Monumente istorice-bisericești din Mitropolia Moldovei și Sucevei (1974) and Psaltirea în versuri a lui Dosoftei, ediție critică (1975); the monographs Catedrala Mitropolitană din Iașui and Mănăstirea Cetățuia (both 1977); brochure-albums to popularise the monasteries of Moldavia, prayer books, etc.

=== Patriarch of the Romanian Orthodox Church ===
Patriarch Justinian died in March 1977. On June 12, 1977, Metropolitan Iustin was elected Archbishop of Bucharest, Metropolitan of Ungro-Vlachia, Patriarch of All Romania. He was enthroned at the Romanian Patriarchal Cathedral, Bucharest, on June 19, 1977. Iustin remained in office until he died in Bucharest on July 31, 1986, and was buried in the Patriarchal Cathedral.

As patriarch, he led several synodal delegations to other churches: the Ecumenical Patriarchate (1978), the Orthodox Church in America Romanian Episcopate (1979), the Russian Orthodox Church (1980), the Serbian Orthodox Church (1981), the Church of Sweden (1981), the Geneva headquarters of the World Council of Churches (1981), the Bulgarian Orthodox Church (1982), the Reformed Church in Hungary (1982) and the Church of Greece (1984). In return, he was visited by a number of church leaders, as well as by numerous representatives of other churches and Christian denominations from all over the world.

Patriarch Iustin paid special attention to publishing activity. He began the great collection Părinți și scriitori bisericești (projected to span 90 volumes), as well as the six-volume set Arta creștină în România. A new synod-approved edition of the Bible appeared in 1982, a new New Testament in 1979, as well as textbooks for higher theological education and for theological seminaries, doctoral theses and devotional books. The Patriarchate's magazines continued to be published, as well as those of the metropolitanates and bulletins for Romanian Orthodox communities abroad.

He helped restore some of Romania's most important churches and monasteries, continuing the work he had begun at Iași. Among the monasteries in question are Curtea de Argeș, Cheia, Zamfira, Viforâta, Dealu, Cernica Monastery, Pasărea, Țigănești, Căldărușani Monastery, Sfântul Spiridon Nou and Sfântul Gheorghe. Moreover, he put work into his own Patriarchal Cathedral, as well as others.

== Offices held ==
- Professor at the Nifon Seminary, Bucharest (1937–1938)
- Professor at the University of Warsaw (1938–1939)
- Professor at the Cernăuți-Suceava Faculty of Theology (1940–1946)
- Professor at the University of Bucharest (1946–1948)
- Professor at the Bucharest Theological Institute (1948–1956)
- Archbishop of Sibiu and Metropolitan of Transylvania (elected 26 February 1956, ordained bishop 15 March 1956, enthroned 18 March 1956)
- Archbishop of Iaşi and Metropolitan of Moldova and Suceava (elected 10 January 1957, enthroned 13 January 1957)
- Archbishop of Bucharest, Metropolitan of Ungro-Vlachia, Patriarch of All Romania (elected 12 June 1977, enthroned 19 June 1977)

== Selected works ==
- Sfânta Scriptură și interpretarea ei în opera Sf. Ioan Hrisostom (1939–1941)
- Originalitatea parabolelor Mântuitorului (1944–1945)
- Activitatea Sfântului Apostol Pavel în Atena (1946)
- Ierarhia bisericească în epoca apostolică. Anexă: Texte biblice si patristice despre pace și muncă (Craiova, 1955)
- Simbolica lui Hristu Andrutsos, traducere din greceşte (Craiova, 1955)
- Sfântul Pavel și viața celor mai de seamă comunități creștine din epoca apostolică (1951)
- Temeiurile lucrării Bisericii pentru apărarea păcii (1953)

== Bibliography ==
- Justin Moisescu in Dicționarul Teologilor Români, Mircea Păcurariu, Ed. Univers Enciclopedic, Bucharest, 1996.
- Dr. Antonie Plămădeală. "Patru trepte în cei 60 de ani de patriarhat ortodox român", in Alte file de calendar de inimă românească, Sibiu, 1988, p. 44-69 (speech given in the Synodal Hall of the Bucharest Patriarchal Palace, 29 September 1985).
- Fr. Prof. Dr. Ioan Rămureanu. "La 70 de ani de viață ai Prea Fericitului Patriarh Iustin", in BOR, yr. XCVIII, 1980, nr. 3–4, p. 339-363.
- Fr. Prof. Dumitru Radu. "Prea Fericitul Patriarh Iustin în teologia românească", in BOR, yr. XCVIII, 1980, nr. 3–4, p. 364-383.
- Fr. Scarlat Porcescu. "Coordonate ale arhipăstoriei Prea Fericitului Patriarh Iustin în scaunul Mitropoliei Moldovei și Sucevei", in BOR, yr. XCVIII, 1980, nr. 3–4, p. 384-403.
- Fr. Dumitru Soare. "Contribuția Prea Fericitului Patriarh Iustin la dezvoltarea relațiilor ecumenice ale Bisericii Ortodoxe Române", in BOR, yr. XCVIII, 1980, nr. 3–4, p. 404-432.
- Fr. Armand Munteanu. "Bibliografia Prea Fericitului Părinte Patriarh Justin", in Mitropolia Olteniei, yr. XXXII, 1980, nr. 3–6, p. 389-401 (other articles in the same edition, p. 265-388).

Eastern Orthodox Church titles
Preceded by Justinian Marina	Patriarch of All Romania; 1977–1986	Succeeded by Teoctist Arăpașu
