= Bălilești =

- Commune
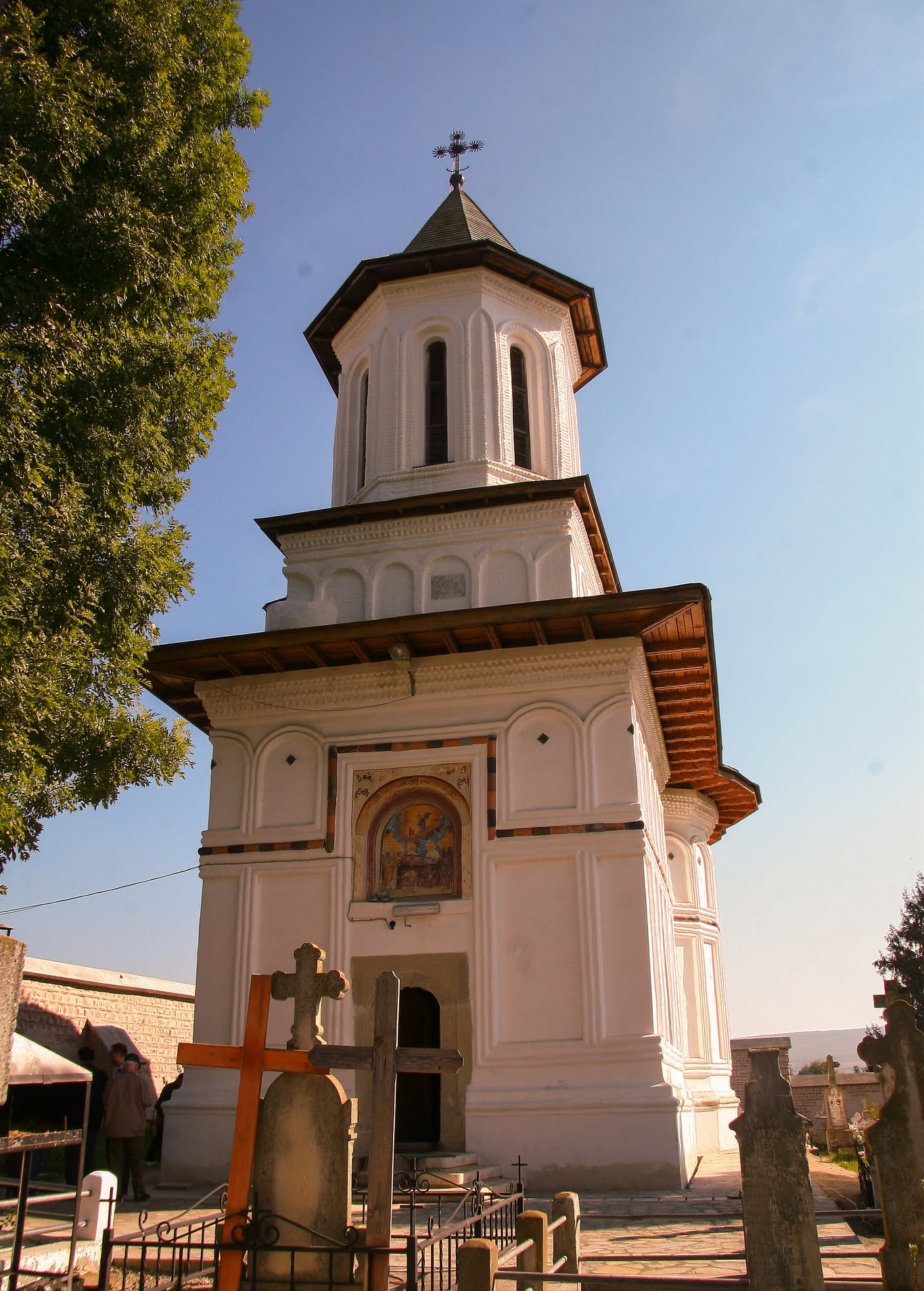
- Assumption of the Virgin Mary Church (1666) in Băjești

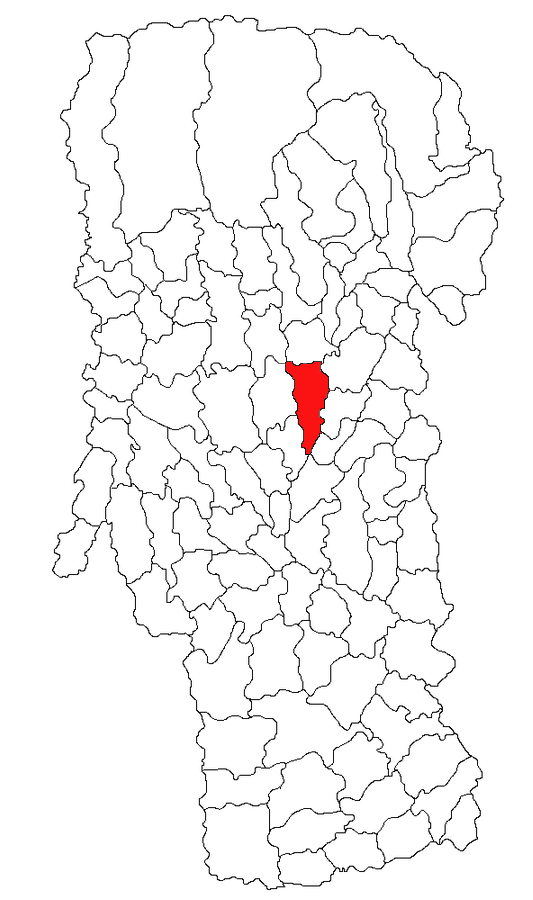
- Location in Argeș County

- Location in Romania
- Coordinates: 45.0702°N 24.9517°E
- Country: Romania
- County: Argeș

Government
  - Mayor (2020–2024): Victor Cătălin Turturică (PSD)
- Area: 59.93 km^{2} (23.14 sq mi)
- Elevation: 455 m (1,493 ft)
- Population (2021-12-01): 3,670
  - Density: 61.2/km^{2} (159/sq mi)
- Time zone: UTC+02:00 (EET)
  - Summer (DST): UTC+03:00 (EEST)
- Postal code: 117080
- Area code: (+40) 0248
- Vehicle reg.: AG
- Website: www.primariabalilesti.ro

Bălilești is a commune in Argeș County, Muntenia, Romania. It is composed of seven villages: Băjești, Bălilești, Golești, Poienița, Priboaia, Ulita, and Valea Mare-Bratia.

The commune is located in the central part of Argeș County, 30 km (19 mi) from Câmpulung and 35 km (22 mi) from the county seat, Pitești. It lies at an altitude of 455 m (1,493 ft), on the banks of the river Bratia.

Historical population
Year	Pop.	±%
2002	4,418	—
2011	4,105	−7.1%
2021	3,670	−10.6%
Source: Census data
