= Bratia (river) =

- Location within Romania

Location
- Country: Romania
- Counties: Argeș County

Physical characteristics
- Source: Iezer Mountains
- Mouth: Râul Târgului
  - location: Țițești
  - coordinates: 44.9998°N 24.9431°E
- Length: 57 km (35 mi)
- Basin size: 360 km^{2} (140 sq mi)

Basin features
- Progression: Râul Târgului→ Râul Doamnei→ Argeș→ Danube→ Black Sea
- Tributaries
  - left: Brătioara, Valea Mare
  - right: Năvrap, Râușor, Slănic

The Bratia is a right tributary of the river Râul Târgului in Romania. It discharges into the Râul Târgului near Negreni. The following villages are situated along the river Bratia, from source to mouth: Cândești, Bratia, Gămăcești, Berevoești, Aninoasa, Valea Siliștii, Vlădești, Poienița, Golești, Bălilești and Băjești. Its length is 57 km (35 mi) and its basin size is 360 km^{2} (140 sq mi).
