= Drăghici (Râul Târgului) =

- Location within Romania

Location
- Country: Romania
- Counties: Argeș County
- Villages: Jugur, Drăghici

Physical characteristics
- Mouth: Râul Târgului
  - location: Mihăești
  - coordinates: 45.1068°N 25.0043°E
- Length: 17 km (11 mi)
- Basin size: 39 km^{2} (15 sq mi)

Basin features
- Progression: Râul Târgului→ Râul Doamnei→ Argeș→ Danube→ Black Sea

The Drăghici is a left tributary of the Râul Târgului in Romania. It flows into the Râul Târgului in Mihăești. Its length is 17 km (11 mi) and its basin size is 39 km^{2} (15 sq mi).
