= Valea Mănăstirii =

Valea Mănăstirii may refer to several villages in Romania:

- Valea Mănăstirii, a village in Râmeț Commune, Alba County
- Valea Mănăstirii, a village in Țițești Commune, Argeș County
- Valea Mănăstirii, a village in Cătunele Commune, Gorj County
