= Valea Râsului River =

There are two rivers called Valea Râsului in Romania:

- Valea Râsului, a tributary of the Motru in Gorj County
- Valea Râsului, a tributary of the Râușor (Dâmbovița) in Argeș County
