= Orzea River =

Orzea River may refer to:

- Orzea, a tributary of the Râușor in Romania
- Orzea, a tributary of the Ialomița in Romania
