= Ileana Mălăncioiu =

Romanian writer, dissident, and activist

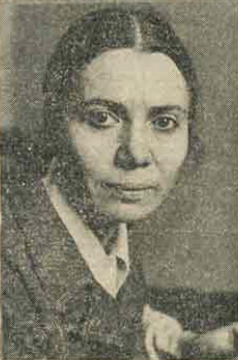
- Born: January 23, 1940 (age 86); Godeni, Argeș County, Kingdom of Romania
- Citizenship: Romania
- Education: University of Bucharest
- Occupations: Poet, essayist, journalist, activist
- Writing career
- Language: Romanian
- Notable awards: Order of the Star of Romania, Commander rank

Ileana Mălăncioiu (born January 23, 1940) is a contemporary Romanian poet, essayist, journalist, dissident, and activist. She has been a corresponding member of the Romanian Academy since 2013.

== Early life and education ==
Mălăncioiu was born in 1940 in the village of Godeni, in the commune of the same name. Of her birth, she later said, "I was the second daughter born to my parents, and I was not received with much joy. They had expected a boy."

After graduating from the Girls' High School in Câmpulung in 1957, she originally trained as an accountant, then studied at the University of Bucharest's Faculty of Philosophy. She graduated in 1968 with a thesis on Lucian Blaga, then went on to obtain a doctor of philosophy from the university in 1977, writing her doctoral thesis on "Tragic Guilt (Greek Tragedies, Shakespeare, Dostoevsky, Kafka)."

== Career ==
Mălăncioiu began writing poetry, with her first published verse appearing in the magazine Luceafărul in 1965. She went on to publish over a dozen volumes of poetry, starting with Pasărea tăiată in 1967, and notably including Ardere de tot, Urcarea muntelui, Skärseldsberget, and the anthology Linia vieții. She is considered one of Romania's most important poets of the 1960s and '70s. Her work often centers on the trauma of history, while incorporating elements of Romanian rural life, folklore, religion, and literature. Mălăncioiu's poetry has been translated into English, including in the collections After the Raising of Lazarus (2005) and The Legend of the Walled-Up Wife (2012), both translated by Eiléan Ní Chuilleanáin.

In 1980, she became the editor of the magazine Viața Românească, where she published such authors as Constantin Noica and Gabriel Liiceanu, among other members of the Păltiniș school. Before 1989 and the Romanian Revolution, she also worked for the public TV station Televiziunea Română, the magazine Argeș, and the animation studio Animafilm. She faced censorship throughout the communist period, resigning from Viața Românească on March 31, 1988, due to tightening censorship, including of Noica's writing. Her 1985 poetry collection Urcarea muntelui ("The Climbing of the Mountain") was republished in 1992 to reincorporate censored material. She is well known for her post-1989 political commentary, forceful in her criticism of both Romanian's former leaders and those who succeeded them.

After 1989, she worked for the sociopolitical weekly Revista 22, as chief editor of the publishing house Litera, and for the literary magazine România Literară. She was awarded the Order of the Star of Romania, Commander rank, in 2000, for her artistic output and for her efforts to promote Romanian culture. In 2013, she was named as a corresponding member of the Romanian Academy.

== Selected works ==
=== Poetry ===
- Pasărea tăiată (The Slaughtered Fowl), Editura Tineretului, 1967
- Către Ieronim (Unto Hieronymus), Editura Albatros, 1970
- Inima reginei (The Queen's Heart), Editura Eminescu, 1971
- Poezii (Poems), Editura Cartea Românească, 1973
- Crini pentru domnișoara mireasă (Lilies for Her Ladyship the Bride), Editura Cartea Românească, 1973 (Romanian Academy Prize)
- Ardere de tot (Burnt Offering), Editura Cartea Românească, 1976
- Peste zona interzisă (Across the Forbidden Zone), Editura Cartea Românească, 1979 (Writers' Union of Romania Prize)
- Cele mai frumoase poezii (The Most Beautiful Poems), Editura Albatros, 1980
- Sora mea de dincolo (My Sister Beyond), Editura Cartea Românească, 1980
- Linia vieții (The Line of Life), Editura Cartea Românească, 1982 (Bucharest Writers Association Prize)
- Peste zona interzisă / A travers la zone interdite, Editura Eminescu, 1984 (French-Romanian bilingual anthology with a preface by Eugen Negrici)
- Urcarea muntelui (The Climbing of the Mountain), Editura Albatros, 1985 (Writers' Union of Romania Prize)
- Peste zona interzisă / Across the Forbidden Zone, Editura Eminescu, 1985 (Bilingual anthology with English translation by Dan Duțescu and with a preface by Valeriu Cristea)
- Urcarea muntelui, Editura Litera, 1992 (2nd edition, uncensored and expanded)
- Ardere de tot (anthology), Editura Eminescu ("Poeți români contemporani" series), 1992 (published and unpublished works)
- Skärseldsberget, Hypatia, Stockholm, 1995 (Swedish translation)
- Poezii, Editura Vitruviu, București, 1996 (published and unpublished works)
- Linia vieții (anthology), Editura Polirom, 1999 (complete works and unpublished poems, with a preface by Nicolae Manolescu)
- After the Raising of Lazarus (După învierea lui Lazăr), Southord Editions, 2005 (English translation)
- Legend of the Walled-up Wife (Legenda femeii zidite), The Gallery Press and Wake Forest University Press, 2012 (English translation)
- Peste zona interzisă. Editura Cartier, 2020 (selected poems collected by Simona Sora)

=== Essays and journalistic writing ===
- Vina tragică, Tragicii Greci, Shakespeare, Dostoievski, Kafka, Editura Cartea Românească, 1978
- Călătorie spre mine însămi, Editura Cartea Românească, 1987
- Crimă și moralitate (political essays), Editura Litera, 1993
- Cronica melancoliei, Editura Enciclopedică, 1998 (Cluj Book Festival Prize)
- A vorbi într-un pustiu, Editura Polirom, 2002
- Recursul la memorie. Convorbiri cu Daniel Cristea-Enache, Editura Polirom, 2003
- Crimă și moralitate. Eseuri și publicistică, Editura Polirom, 2006
- Am reușit să rămîn eu însămi, Editura Polirom, 2016
