= Capu Piscului =

Capu Piscului may refer to several villages in Romania:

- Capu Piscului, a village in Godeni Commune, Argeș County
- Capu Piscului, a village in Merișani Commune, Argeș County
