= Mănăstirea (Râul Târgului) =

River in Romania

Mânăstirea
- Location within Romania

Location
- Country: Romania
- Counties: Argeș County
- Villages: Pițigaia, Valea Mănăstirii, Țițești

Physical characteristics
- Mouth: Râul Târgului
  - location: Cișmea
  - coordinates: 44.9980°N 24.9436°E
- Length: 16 km (9.9 mi)
- Basin size: 23 km^{2} (8.9 sq mi)

Basin features
- Progression: Râul Târgului→ Râul Doamnei→ Argeș→ Danube→ Black Sea

The Mânăstirea is a left tributary of the Râul Târgului in Romania. It flows into the Râul Târgului at Cișmea. Its length is 16 km (9.9 mi), and its basin area is 23 km^{2} (8.9 sq mi).
