= Sava Dumitrescu =

Romanian pharmacologist (1927–2019)

- Born: January 19, 1927; Mihăești, Romania
- Died: September 7, 2019 (aged 92); Iași, România
- Occupation: pharmacologist

Sava Dumitrescu (born January 19, 1927, in Mihăești, Argeș – died September 7, 2019, Iași) was a Romanian pharmacologist and professor at the Grigore T. Popa University of Medicine and Pharmacy in Iaşi, Romania. He also served as rector of the university. He retired from teaching in 1993, but continued his research activities.

Sava Dumitrescu published the "Handbook of Pharmacology", in 2 volumes (1981 and 1985). He is also President of the Romanian National Ethics Committee.
