= Mihail Corbuleanu =

Romanian general

Mihail Corbuleanu (5 June 1894 – 3 July 1973) was a Romanian major general during World War II.

He was born in 1894 in Vlădești, Argeș County. He reached the rank of lieutenant colonel in 1934 and colonel in 1939. Corbuleanu was military attaché to Rome in 1940. In March 1943 he was promoted to brigadier general. In 1944 he was briefly in reserve, but then became general officer commanding 13th Training Division, commanding officer 18th Brigade, general officer commanding 6th Division, and again became commanding officer 18th Brigade. In early 1945 he was general officer commanding 18th Division, but went into reserve that year. He was promoted to major general in December 1946, and retired in August 1947. He died in 1973 in Bucharest.

Corbuleanu was awarded Order of the Star of Romania, Officer class, on June 8, 1940 and the Order of Michael the Brave, 3rd class, on August 4, 1945.

== Works ==
- Corbuleanu, Mihail (1970). De pe Mureș pe Morava (in Romanian). București: Editura Militară. OCLC 490875625.
