= Bughea de Jos =

- Commune
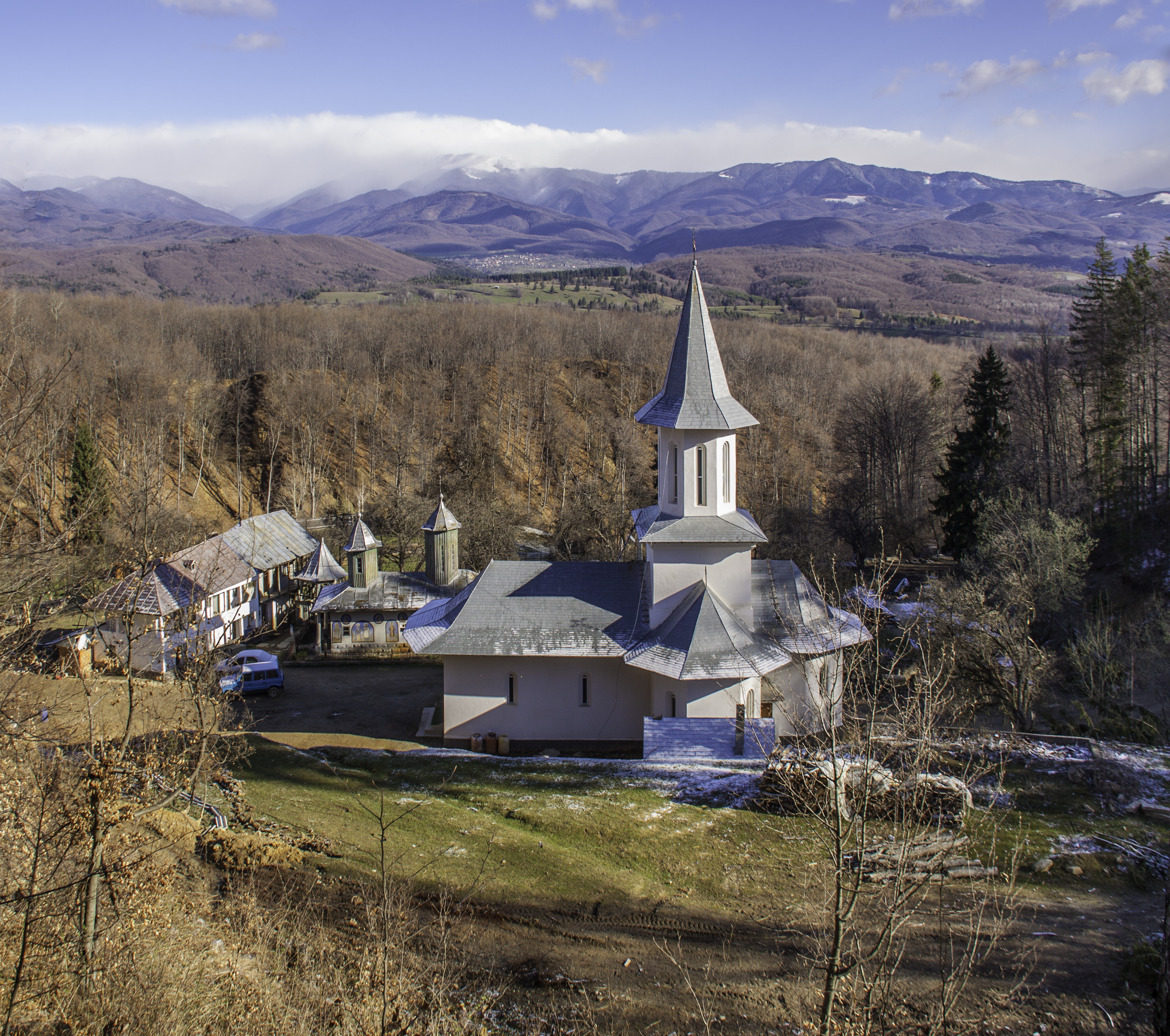
- Ciocanu hermitage, Bughea de Jos

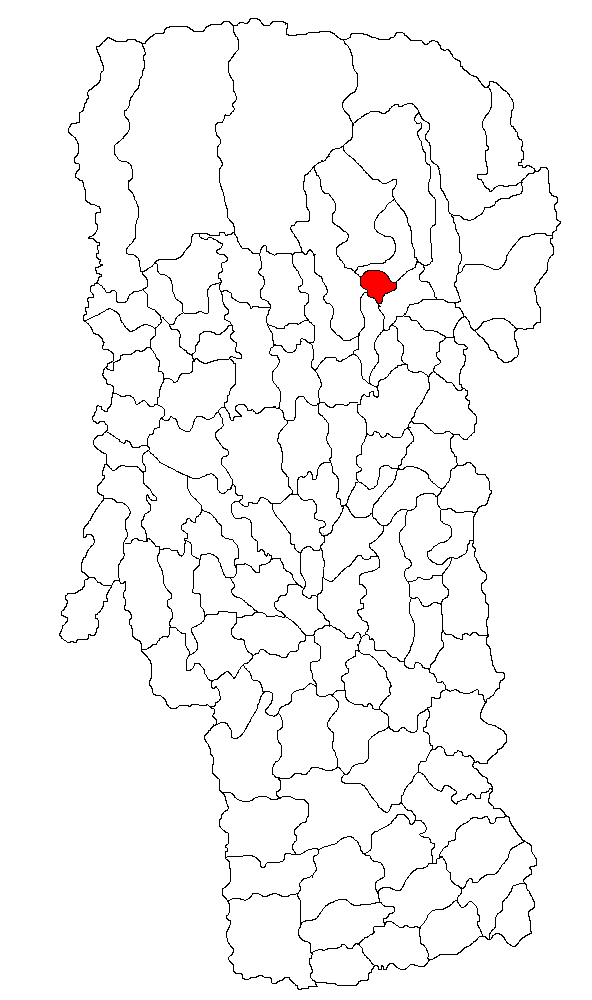
- Location in Argeș County

- Location in Romania
- Coordinates: 45.2800°N 24.9916°E
- Country: Romania
- County: Argeș

Government
  - Mayor (2024–2028): Bogdan Oancea (PSD)
- Area: 24 km^{2} (9.3 sq mi)
- Elevation: 673 m (2,208 ft)
- Population (2021-12-01): 2,950
  - Density: 120/km^{2} (320/sq mi)
- Time zone: UTC+02:00 (EET)
  - Summer (DST): UTC+03:00 (EEST)
- Postal code: 117165
- Area code: +(40) 248
- Vehicle reg.: AG
- Website: www.primariabugheadejos.ro

Bughea de Jos is a commune in Argeș County, Muntenia, Romania. It is composed of a single village, Bughea de Jos.

The commune is situated on the banks of the river Bughea. The hamlet Valea Măcelarului is situated on the left bank of the river Bratia.

Historical population
Year	Pop.	±%
2002	2,989	—
2011	2,862	−4.2%
2021	2,950	+3.1%
Source: Census data
