= Vlădești, Argeș =

Vlădești
- Commune
- Location in Romania
- Coordinates: 45.1534°N 24.9360°E
- Country: Romania
- County: Argeș

Government
  - Mayor (2020–2024): Cristian Dică-Hristu (PSD)
- Area: 38.94 km^{2} (15.03 sq mi)
- Elevation: 426 m (1,398 ft)
- Population (2021-12-01): 2,978
  - Density: 76/km^{2} (200/sq mi)
- Time zone: EET/EEST (UTC+2/+3)
- Postal code: 117840
- Area code: +(40) 248
- Vehicle reg.: AG
- Website: www.cjarges.ro/en/web/vladesti

Vlădești is a commune in Argeș County, Muntenia, Romania. It is composed of four villages: Coteasca, Drăghescu, Putina, and Vlădești.

The commune is located 45 km (28 mi) from Pitești and 27 km (17 mi) from Câmpulung. The Bratia River passes through Vlădești village.

== Natives ==
- Mihail Corbuleanu (1894–1973), major general during World War II
- Mircea Diaconu (1949–2024), actor, writer, and politician
