= Laurencius de Longo-Campo =

Laurencius de Longo-Campo (Romanian: Laurențiu de Câmpulung; d. 1300) was the last Transylvanian Saxon count of Câmpulung in Wallachia. After the model of the Transylvanian Saxon communities from Transylvania, the group from the south of the Carpathians also had a count leading them, who also had the title of "greav".

Laurencius de Longo-Campo was likely the last count of Câmpulung. His gravestone remains today in the Roman Catholic "Bărăția" Church, Câmpulung. The text written on the gravestone is the oldest medieval epigraphic document from Wallachia, and, at the same time, the first written mention of the city. The inscription, written in Latin is dated 1300 and has the following text: Hic sepultus est comes Laurencius de Longo-Campo, pie memorie, anno Domini MCCC ("Here is buried count Laurencius de Longo-Campo, in pious memory, 1300 Anno Domini"). There is a debate regarding Laurencius, some historians considering him a representative of the Hungarian king, while some consider him a representative of the Wallachian voivode. The function of the count was later replaced by the one of a "jude", chosen by the townspeople and helped by 12 "bürgers".
