= Viorel Moiceanu =

Romanian footballer

Personal information
- Date of birth: 5 July 1954 (age 72)
- Place of birth: Berevoești, Romania
- Position: Forward

Senior career*
Years	Team	Apps	(Gls)
1977–1978	Dacia Pitești		
1978–1986	Argeș Pitești	201	(38)
1988	Metalurgistul Slatina		
1989	Dacia Pitești		
- * Club domestic league appearances and goals

Viorel Moiceanu (born 5 July 1954) is a Romanian former football forward.

== Career ==
Moiceanu was born on 5 July 1954 in Berevoești, Romania and began playing football in 1977 at Divizia C side Dacia Pitești.

After one season, he joined neighboring club Argeș Pitești. On 13 September 1978, he made his debut in the first leg of the first round of the 1978–79 UEFA Cup against Panathinaikos, as coach Florin Halagian sent him in the 73rd minute to replace Nicolae Dobrin, and he went on to score the last two goals of the 3–0 win. Four days later he made his Divizia A debut when Halagian sent him at half-time to again replace Dobrin in a 2–2 draw against Universitatea Craiova. After Argeș eliminated Panathinaikos, they met Valencia in the second round of the UEFA Cup where in the first leg he was sent in the 61st minute and scored the victory goal of the 2–1 win. Moiceanu exchanged t-shirts with Mario Kempes after the game, a player who just won the World Cup with Argentina, being the top-scorer and best player of the tournament. However, they did not qualify further as the second leg was lost with 5–2. At the end of his first season, Moiceanu helped the club win the title, contributing with five goals in the 25 appearances given to him by Halagian. He spent eight seasons with Argeș, scoring a personal record of nine goals in the 1984–85 season. He played his last Divizia A match on 5 October 1985 in a 3–1 away loss to Petrolul Ploiești when early in the game he was injured by Octavian Grigore. Moiceanu has a total of 201 appearances with 38 goals in the Romanian top league and 10 matches with three goals in the UEFA Cup.

Between 1988 and 1989 he had spells in Divizia B for Metalurgistul Slatina and Dacia Pitești. Moiceanu was a player known for being decisive after being introduced in the games as a substitute, a quality for which he was nicknamed "Arma Secretă" (The Secret Weapon) by journalist Ioan Chirilă.

== Honours ==
Argeș Pitești

- Divizia A: 1978–79
