= Aninoasa, Argeș =

Aninoasa
- Commune
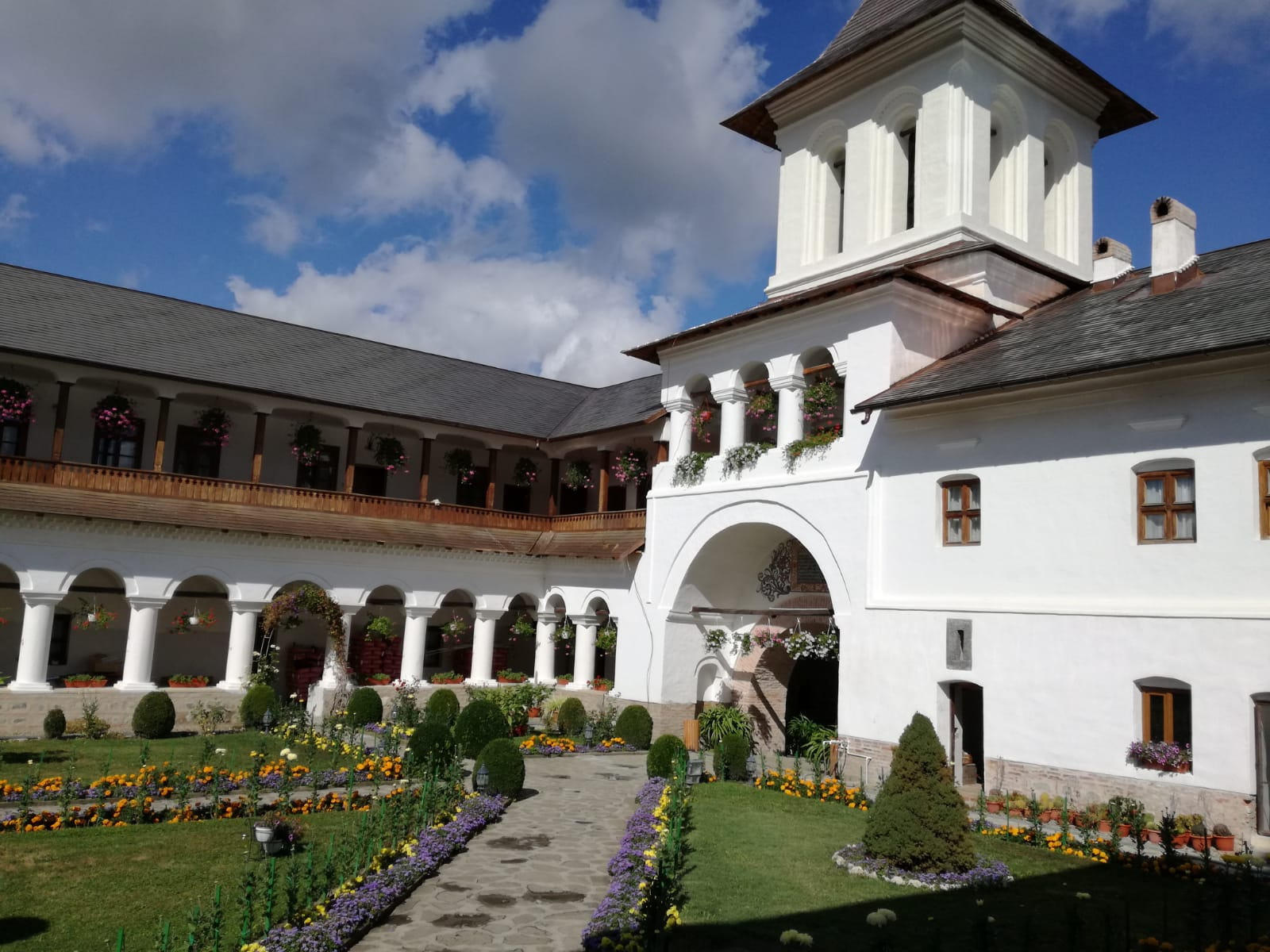
- Aninoasa Monastery

- Location in Romania
- Coordinates: 45°11′39.4″N 24°55′41.3″E
- Country: Romania
- County: Argeș

Government
  - Mayor (2021–2024): Nicolae-Marius Manole (PSD)
- Area: 57.57 km^{2} (22.23 sq mi)
- Elevation: 161 m (528 ft)
- Population (2021-12-01): 3,190
  - Density: 55.4/km^{2} (144/sq mi)
- Time zone: UTC+02:00 (EET)
  - Summer (DST): UTC+03:00 (EEST)
- Postal code: 117035
- Area code: +(40) 248
- Vehicle reg.: AG
- Website: www.cjarges.ro/en/web/aninoasa

Aninoasa is a commune in Argeș County, Muntenia, Romania. It is composed of four villages: Aninoasa, Broșteni, Slănic, and Valea Siliștii.

The commune is located in the north-central part of the county. It is crossed by the DN73C road that connects Câmpulung (20 km (12 mi) to the northeast) to Curtea de Argeș (35 km (22 mi) to the west). The river Bratia passes through the Aninoasa and Valea Siliștii villages.

The Aninoasa Monastery (dating from 1678) is situated on the territory of the commune.

Historical population
Year	Pop.	±%
2002	3,364	—
2011	3,299	−1.9%
2021	3,190	−3.3%
Source: Census data
