= Râușor (Râul Târgului) =

- Location within Romania

Location
- Country: Romania
- Counties: Argeș County

Physical characteristics
- Mouth: Râul Târgului
  - location: Râușor Reservoir
  - coordinates: 45.4057°N 25.0351°E
- Length: 10 km (6.2 mi)
- Basin size: 36 km^{2} (14 sq mi)

Basin features
- Progression: Râul Târgului→ Râul Doamnei→ Argeș→ Danube→ Black Sea
- Tributaries
  - left: Huluba, Baratu

The Râușor is a right tributary of the Râul Târgului in Romania. It discharges into the Râușor Reservoir, which is drained by the Râul Târgului. Its length is 10 km (6.2 mi) and its basin size is 36 km^{2} (14 sq mi).
