= Mihăești, Argeș =

Mihăești
- Commune
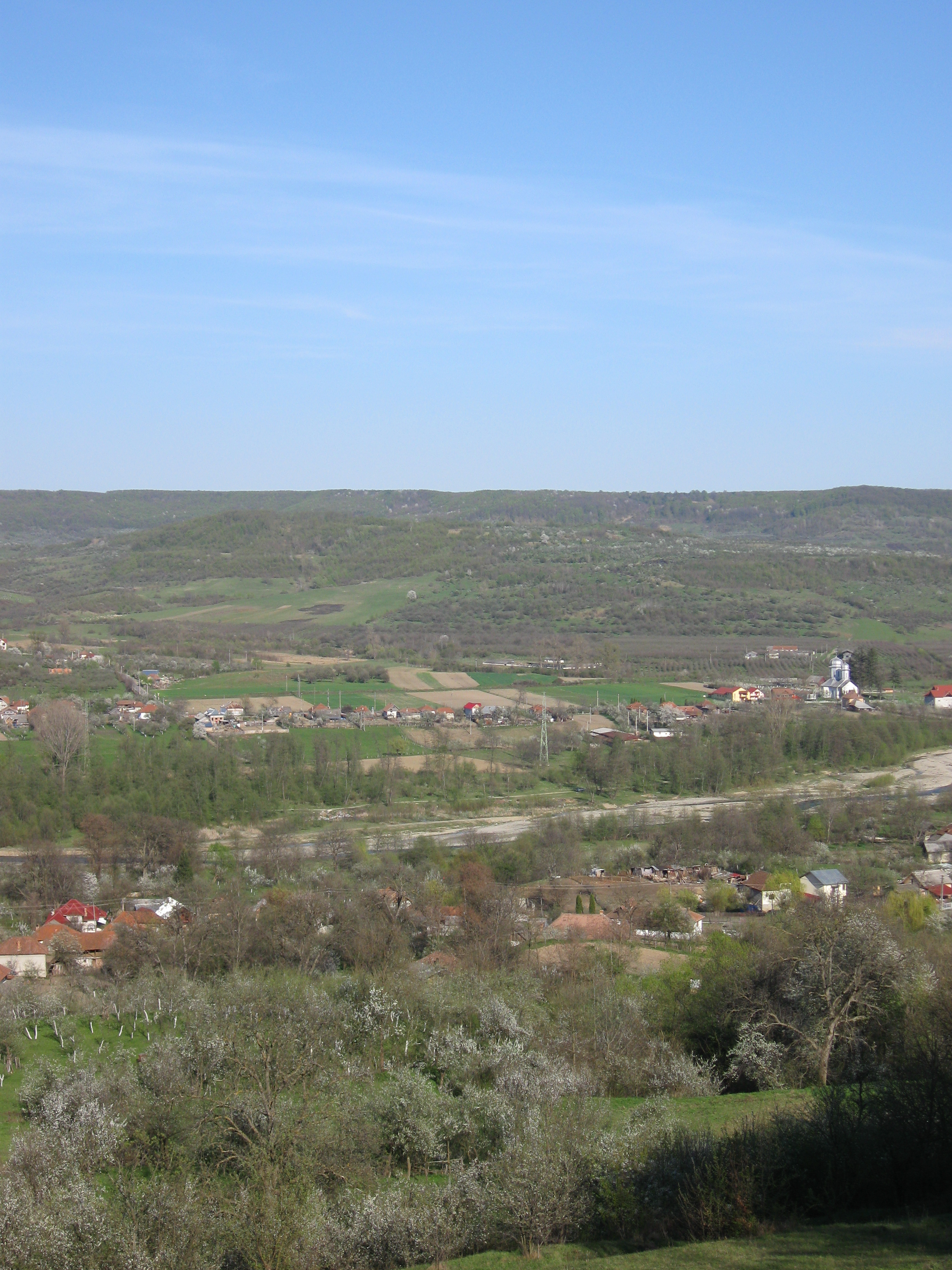
- Mihăești and Râul Târgului, seen from the west

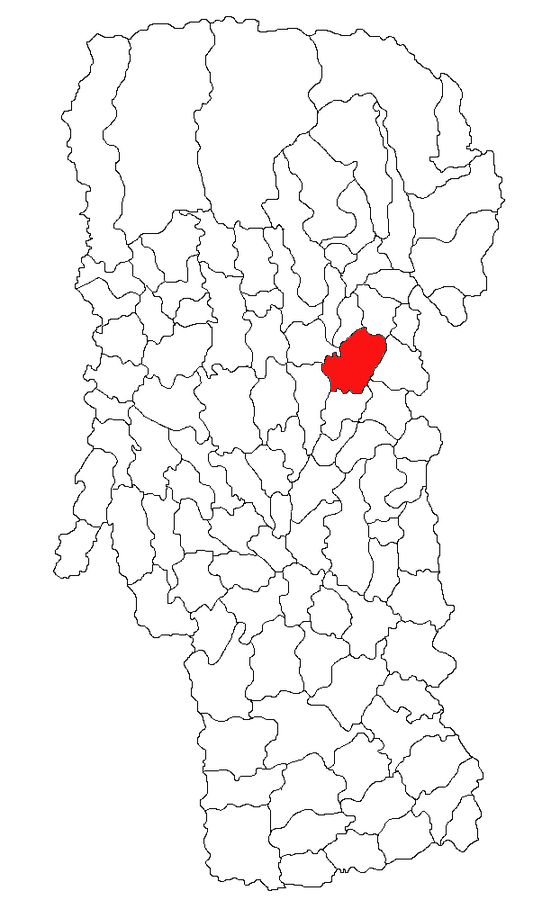
- Location in Argeș County

- Location in Romania
- Coordinates: 45.1244°N 25.0178°E
- Country: Romania
- County: Argeș

Government
  - Mayor (2020–2024): Andreea-Iuliana Crîmpiță-Matei (PSD)
- Area: 34 km^{2} (13 sq mi)
- Elevation: 412 m (1,352 ft)
- Population (2021-12-01): 5,726
  - Density: 170/km^{2} (440/sq mi)
- Time zone: UTC+02:00 (EET)
  - Summer (DST): UTC+03:00 (EEST)
- Postal code: 117470
- Area code: +(40) 248
- Vehicle reg.: AG
- Website: www.cjarges.ro/web/mihaesti

Mihăești is a commune in Argeș County, Muntenia, Romania. It is composed of seven villages: Drăghici, Furnicoși, Mihăești, Rudeni, Valea Bradului, Valea Popii, and Văcarea.

The Râul Târgului crosses the commune from north to south.

== Natives ==
- Sava Dumitrescu (1927–2019), pharmacologist and academic
