= Râușor Dam =

Dam located in Argeș County, Romania

Râușor

- Location within Romania
- Country: Romania
- Coordinates: 45.393824°N 25.062729°E
- Purpose: Water supply, hydroelectricity, irrigation
- Opening date: 1987
- Owner: Hidroelectrica

Dam and spillways
- Type of dam: Embankment dam
- Impounds: Râul Târgului
- Height: 120
- Length: 380
- Dam volume: 60 million m³
- Spillway type: Gated
- Spillway capacity: 620 m³/s

Reservoir
- Catchment area: 115 km²
- Surface area: 190 ha
- Website link

Râușor is a rock-fill water dam build in 1987 in the far north of Argeș County, Romania. It impounds the Râul Târgului. It has a wall height of 120 m (390 ft) and a total volume of 60 million m³.
