= Berevoești =

- Commune
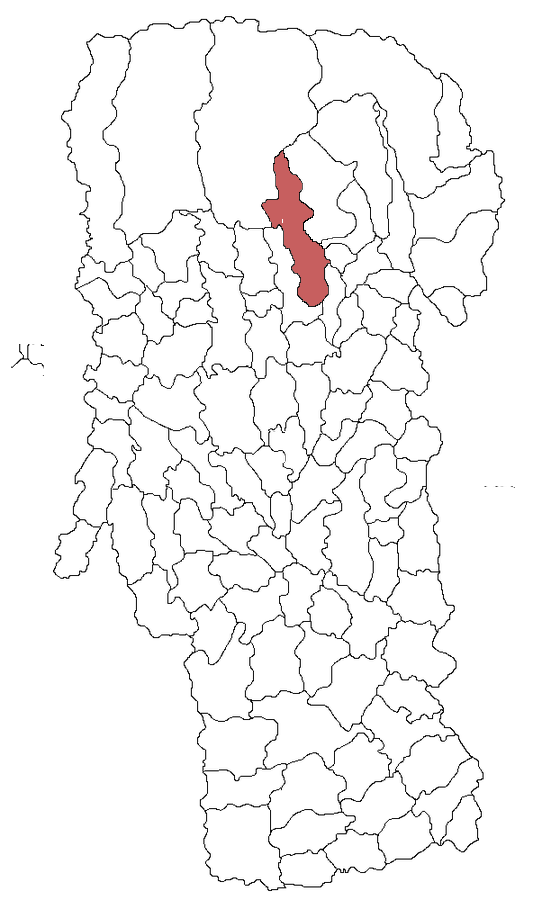
- Location in Argeș County

- Location in Romania
- Coordinates: 45°13′45″N 24°56′09″E
- Country: Romania
- County: Argeș

Government
  - Mayor (2024–2028): Ionel Mazilu (PSD)
- Area: 102 km^{2} (39 sq mi)
- Elevation: 501 m (1,644 ft)
- Population (2021-12-01): 3,307
  - Density: 32.4/km^{2} (84.0/sq mi)
- Time zone: UTC+02:00 (EET)
  - Summer (DST): UTC+03:00 (EEST)
- Postal code: 117115
- Area code: +(40) 248
- Vehicle reg.: AG
- Website: www.cjarges.ro/en/web/berevoesti

Berevoești is a commune in Argeș County, Muntenia, Romania. It is composed of four villages: Berevoești, Bratia, Gămăcești, and Oțelu.

The Bratia River passes through the Gămăcești and Bratia villages.

Historical population
Year	Pop.	±%
2002	3,429	—
2011	3,372	−1.7%
2021	3,307	−1.9%
Source: Census data

== Natives ==
- Viorel Moiceanu (born 1954), footballer
