= Godeni =

- Commune
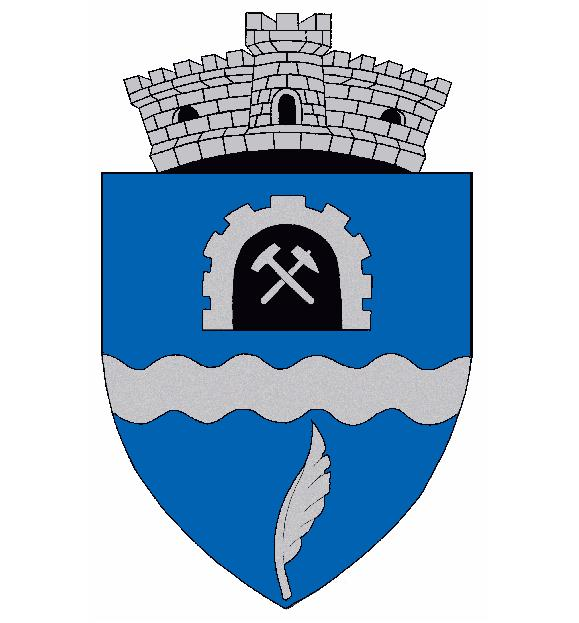
- Coat of arms

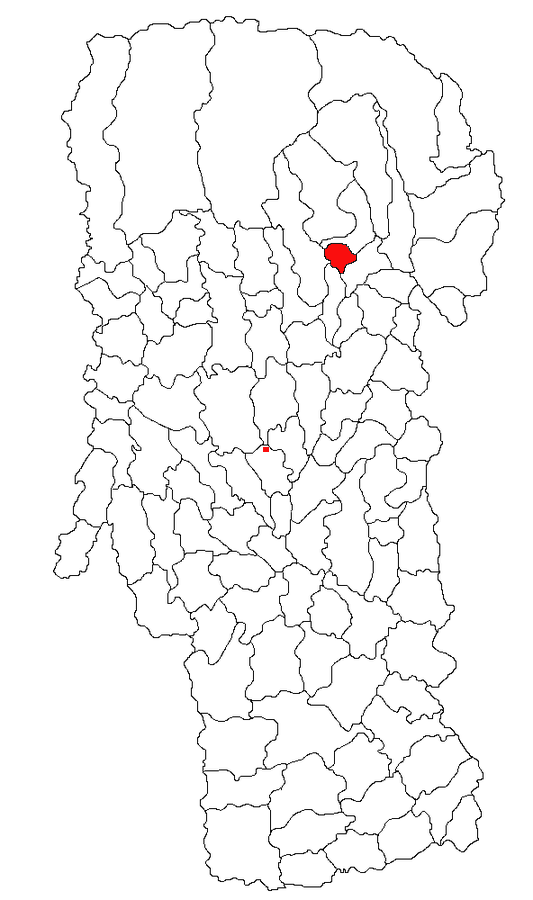
- Location in Argeș County

- Location in Romania
- Coordinates: 45°13′28″N 24°58′52″E
- Country: Romania
- County: Argeș
- Established: 1461 (first official record)

Government
  - Mayor (2020–2024): Ion Pădureanu (PSD)
- Area: 33 km^{2} (13 sq mi)
- Elevation: 528 m (1,732 ft)
- Population (2021-12-01): 2,535
  - Density: 77/km^{2} (200/sq mi)
- Time zone: EET/EEST (UTC+2/+3)
- Postal code: 117385
- Area code: +(40) 248
- Vehicle reg.: AG
- Website: www.godeni.ro

Godeni is a commune in Argeș County, Muntenia, Romania. It is composed of five villages: Bordeieni, Capu Piscului, Cotești, Godeni, and Malu.

The commune is situated in the southern foothills of the Făgăraș Mountains, at an altitude of 528 m (1,732 ft), on the banks of the river Bughea. It is located in the northern part of Argeș County, 8 km (5 mi) southwest of Câmpulung and 48 km (30 mi) north of the county seat, Pitești.

== Notable people ==
- Ileana Mălăncioiu (born 1940), poet and essayist
