= Bughea de Sus =

- Commune
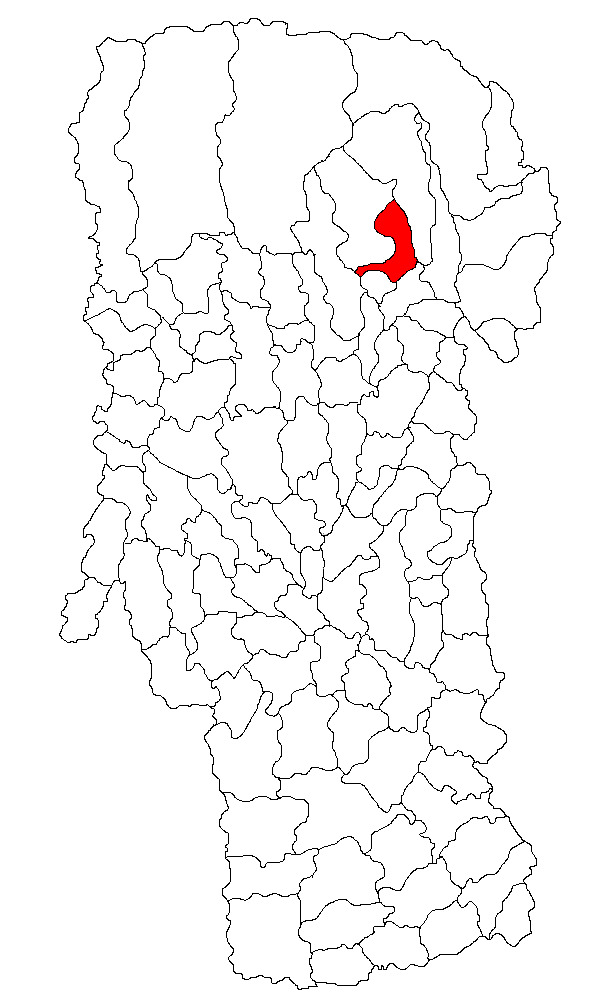
- Location in Argeș County

- Location in Romania
- Coordinates: 45.3516°N 25.0272°E
- Country: Romania
- County: Argeș

Government
  - Mayor (2024–2028): Nicolae Tarbă (PNL)
- Area: 33.16 km^{2} (12.80 sq mi)
- Elevation: 651 m (2,136 ft)
- Population (2021-12-01): 2,966
  - Density: 89.45/km^{2} (231.7/sq mi)
- Time zone: UTC+02:00 (EET)
  - Summer (DST): UTC+03:00 (EEST)
- Postal code: 117027
- Area code: +(40) 248
- Vehicle reg.: AG
- Website: www.primariabugheadesus.ro

Bughea de Sus is a commune in Argeș County, Muntenia, Romania. It is composed of a single village, Bughea de Sus. The village was part of Albeștii de Muscel Commune, as well as being the commune center, until 2004, when it was split off.

Historical population
| Year | Pop. | ±% |
|---|---|---|
| 2002 | 2,845 | — |
| 2011 | 2,997 | +5.3% |
| 2021 | 2,966 | −1.0% |
Source: Census data
