= Râușor (Dâmbovița) =

- Location within Romania

Location
- Country: Romania
- Counties: Argeș County
- Villages: Rucăr

Physical characteristics
- Source: Iezer Mountains
- Mouth: Dâmbovița
  - location: Rucăr
  - coordinates: 45.3858°N 25.1723°E
- Length: 16 km (9.9 mi)
- Basin size: 50 km^{2} (19 sq mi)

Basin features
- Progression: Dâmbovița→ Argeș→ Danube→ Black Sea

The Râușor (in its upper course also: Boteanu) is a right tributary of the river Dâmbovița in Romania. It flows into the Dâmbovița in Rucăr. Its length is 16 km (9.9 mi) and its basin size is 50 km^{2} (19 sq mi).

== Tributaries ==
The following rivers are tributaries to the river Râușor (from source to mouth):

- Left: Valea Lupului
- Right: Bugheanu, Măra, Purdel, Strâmba, Orzea, Grozea, Valea Râsului, Cămârzanu, Pârâul Podurilor, Valea Andreiașului
