= Țițești =

- Commune
- Location in Romania
- Coordinates: 45°01′N 25°00′E
- Country: Romania
- County: Argeș
- Population (2021-12-01): 5,232
- Time zone: UTC+02:00 (EET)
  - Summer (DST): UTC+03:00 (EEST)
- Vehicle reg.: AG

Țițești is a commune in Argeș County, Muntenia, Romania. It is composed of five villages: Bucșenești-Lotași, Cișmea, Țițești, Valea Mănăstirii and Valea Stânii.
