= Câmpulung =

Municipality in Argeș County, Romania

- Municipality
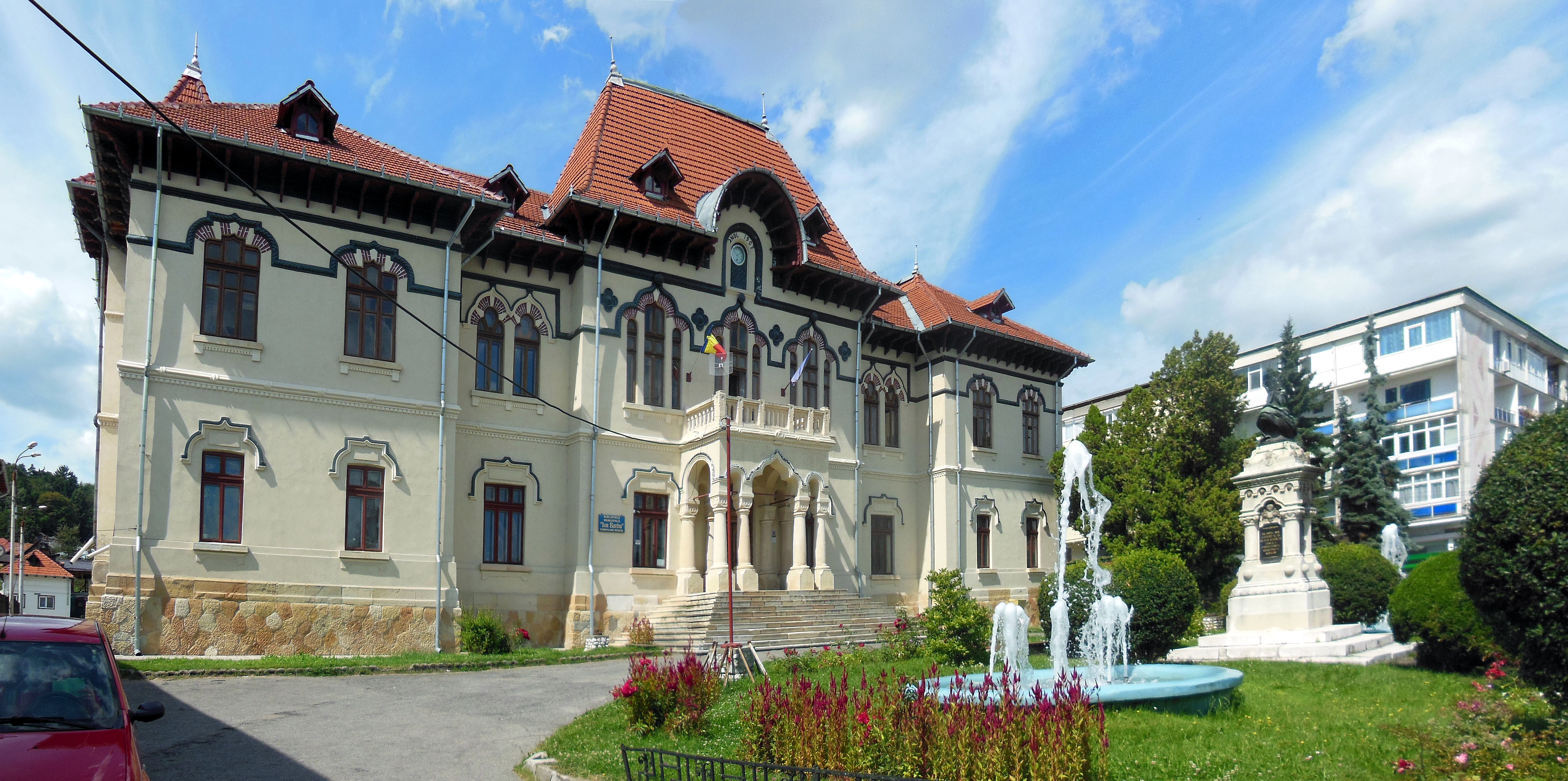
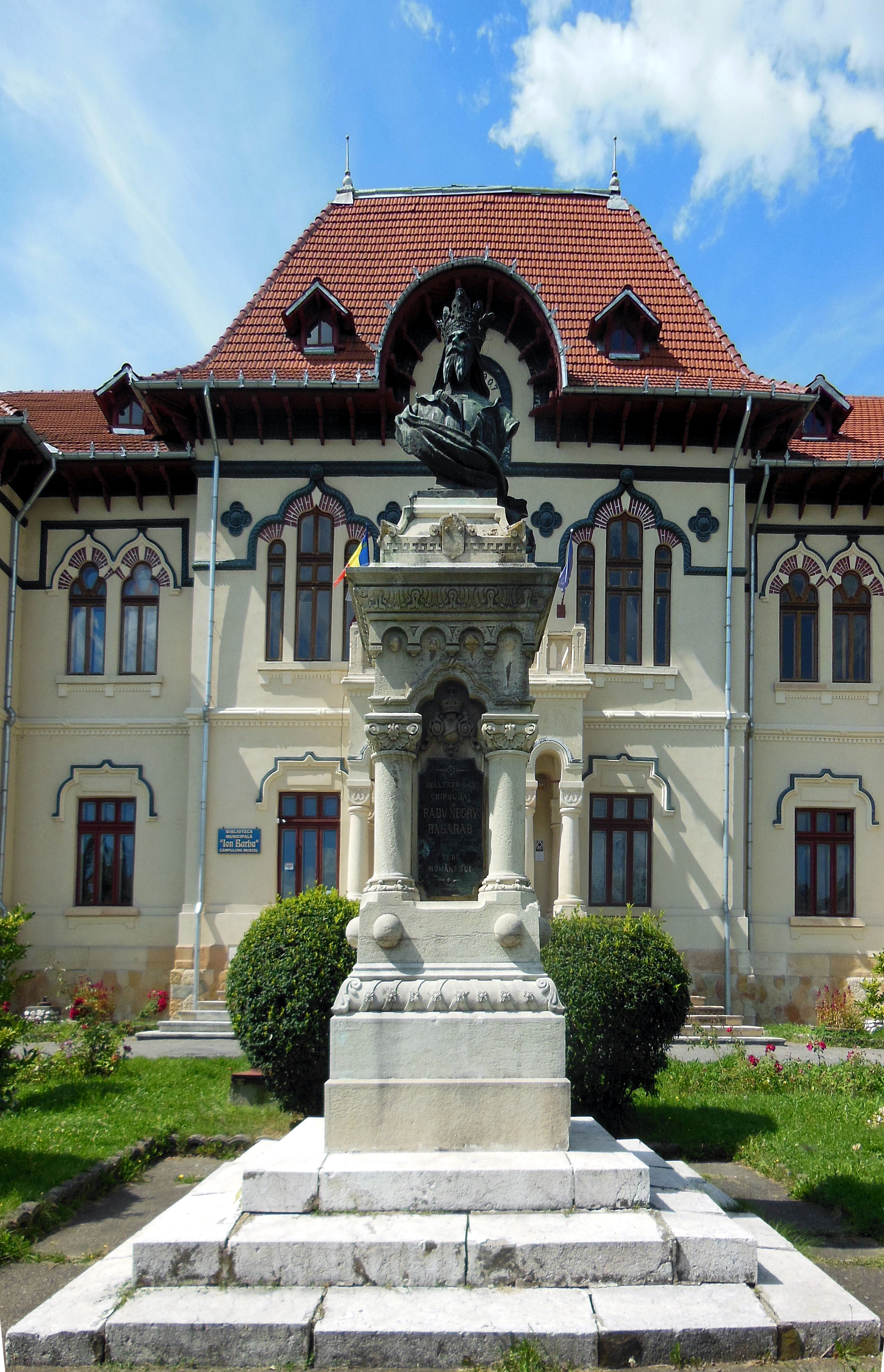
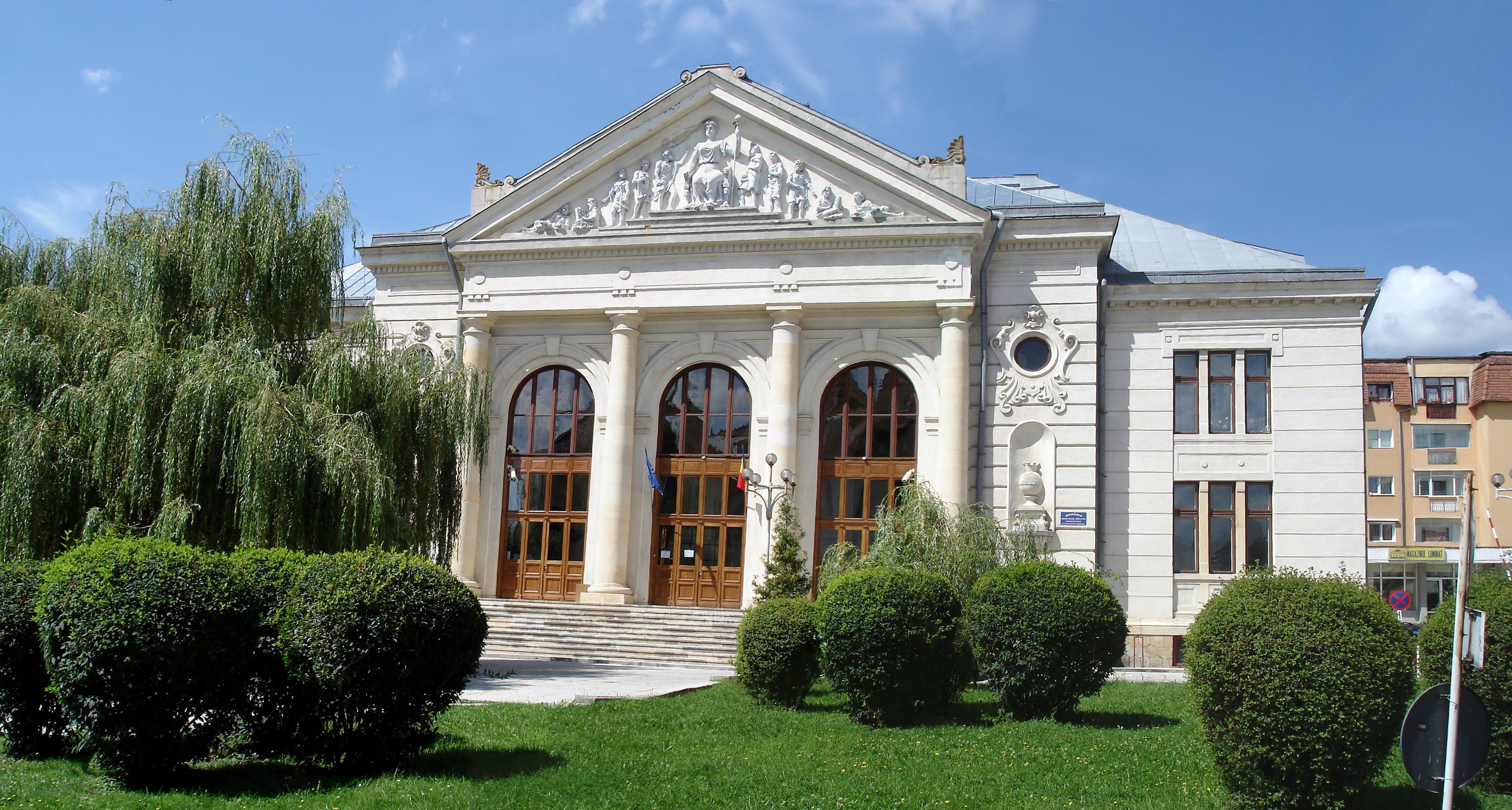
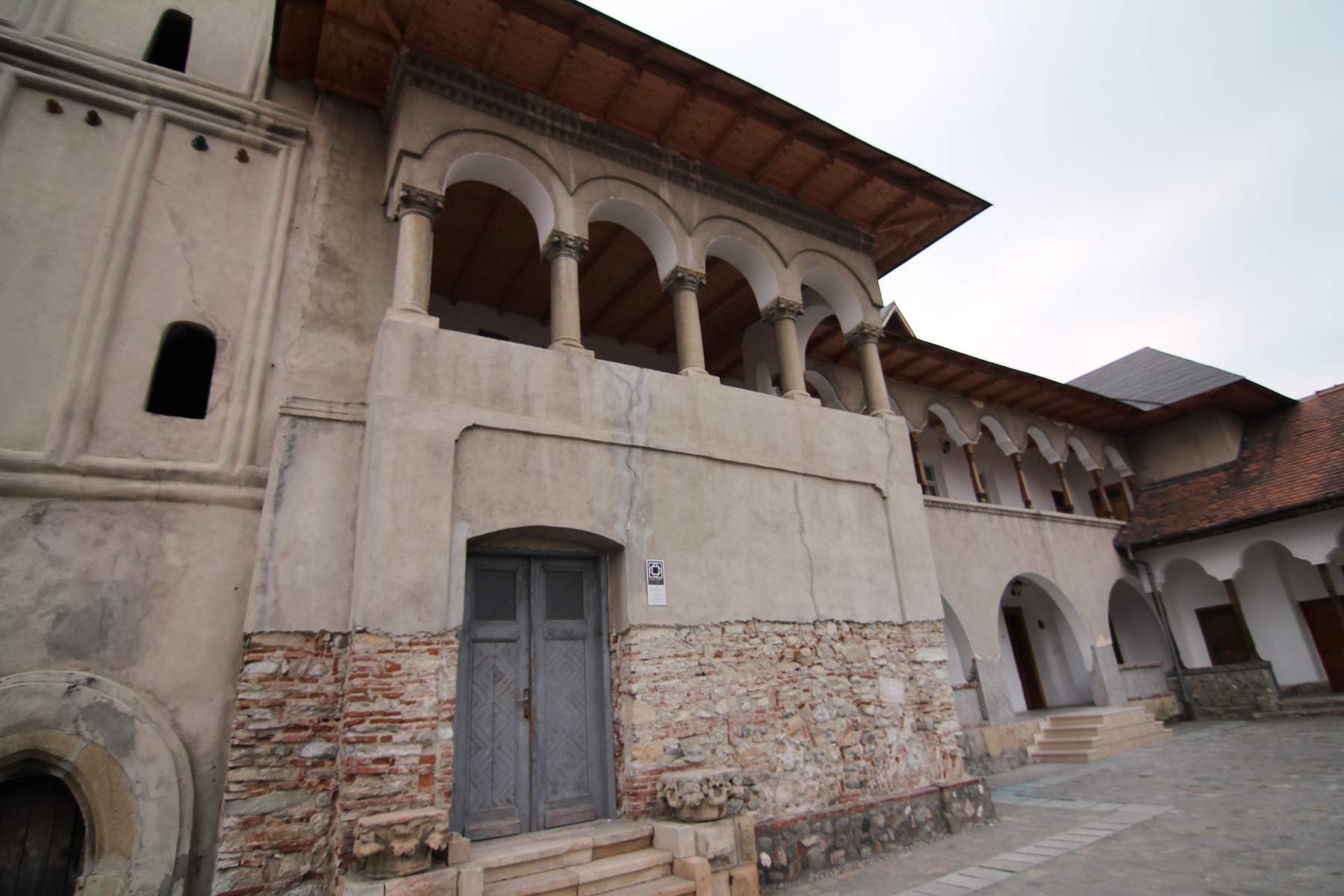
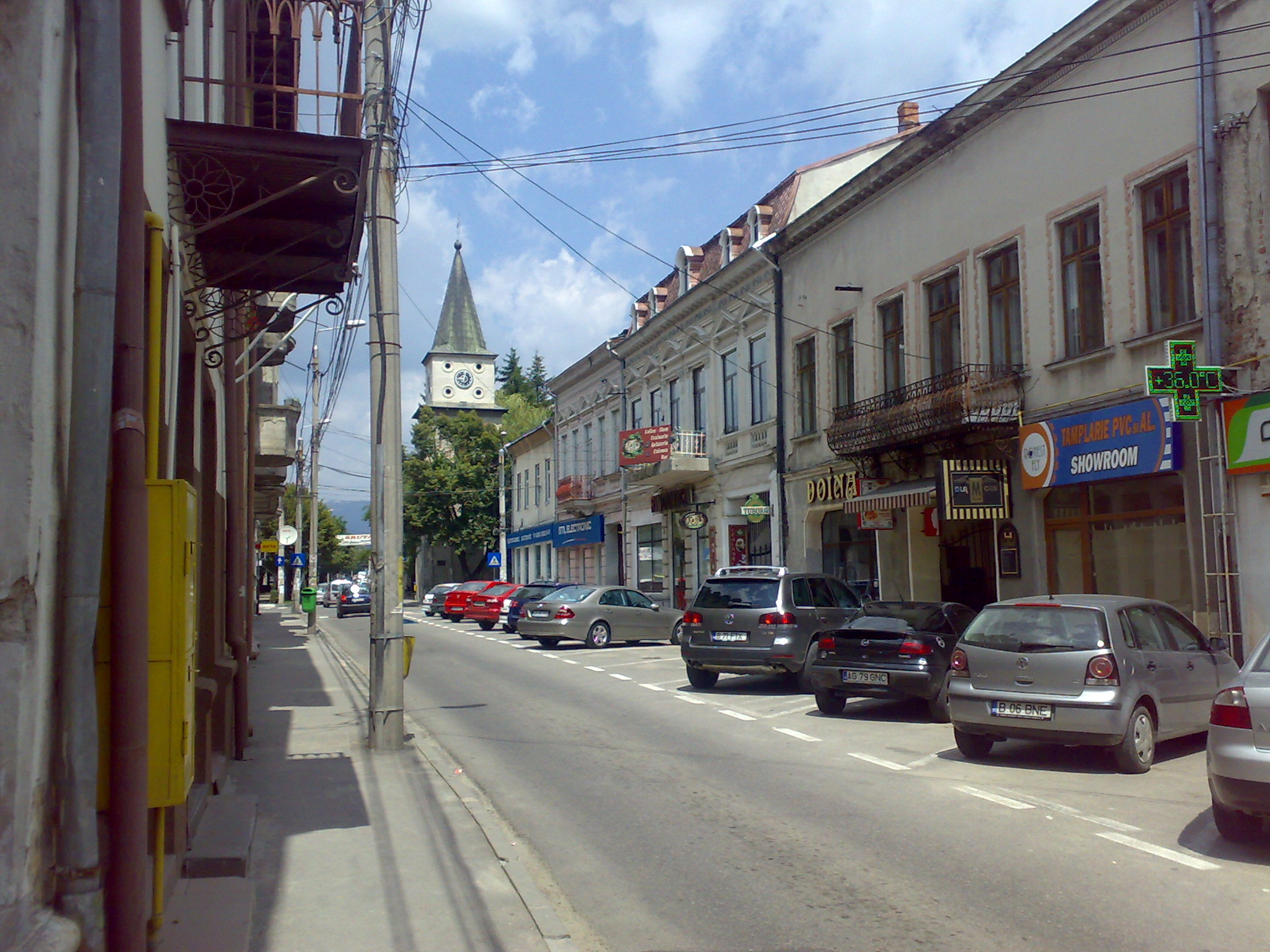
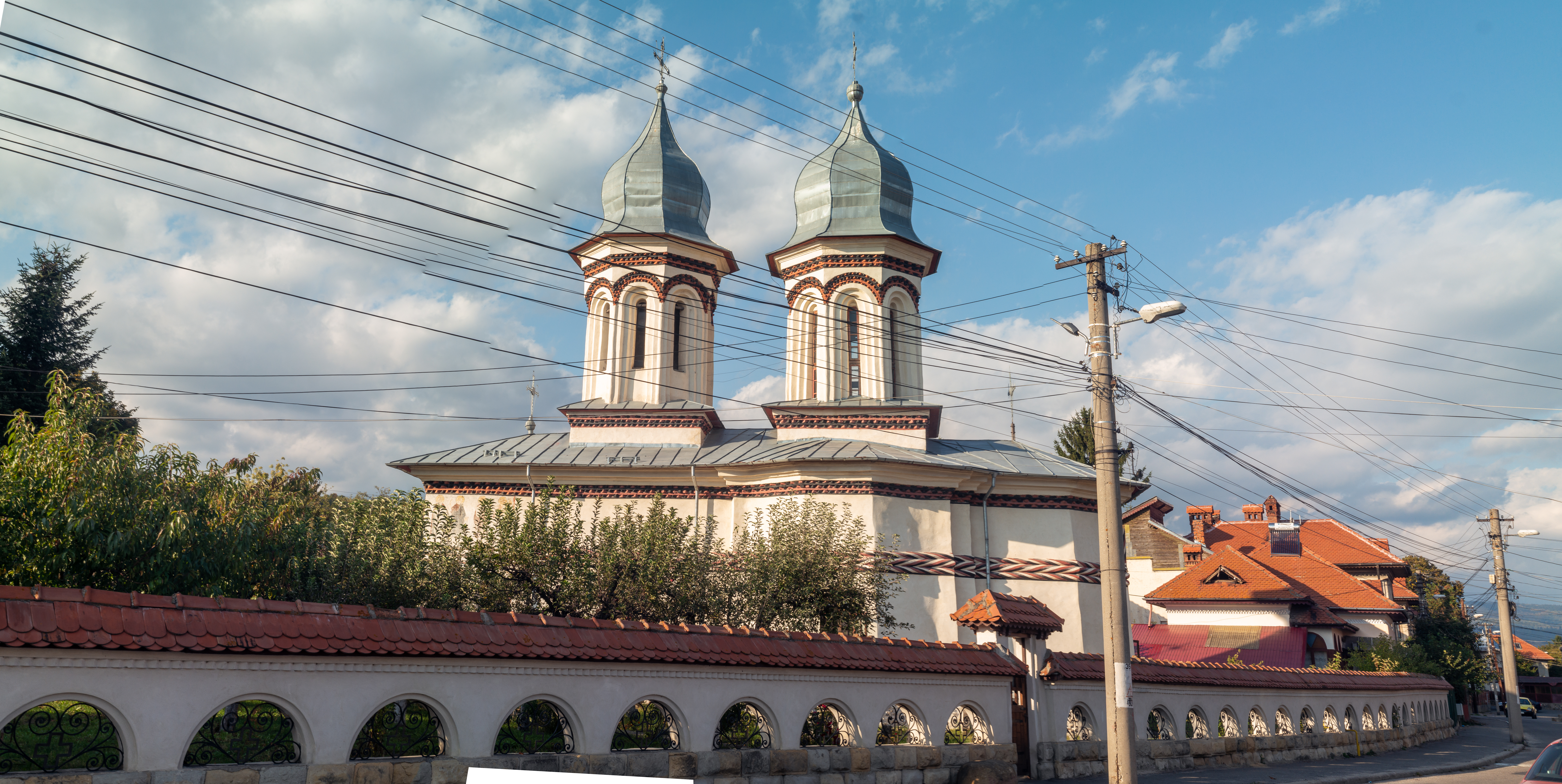
- City Hall The bust of Negru Vodă Courthouse Negru Vodă Monastery Old Town Biserica Sfinții Împărați - Șubești

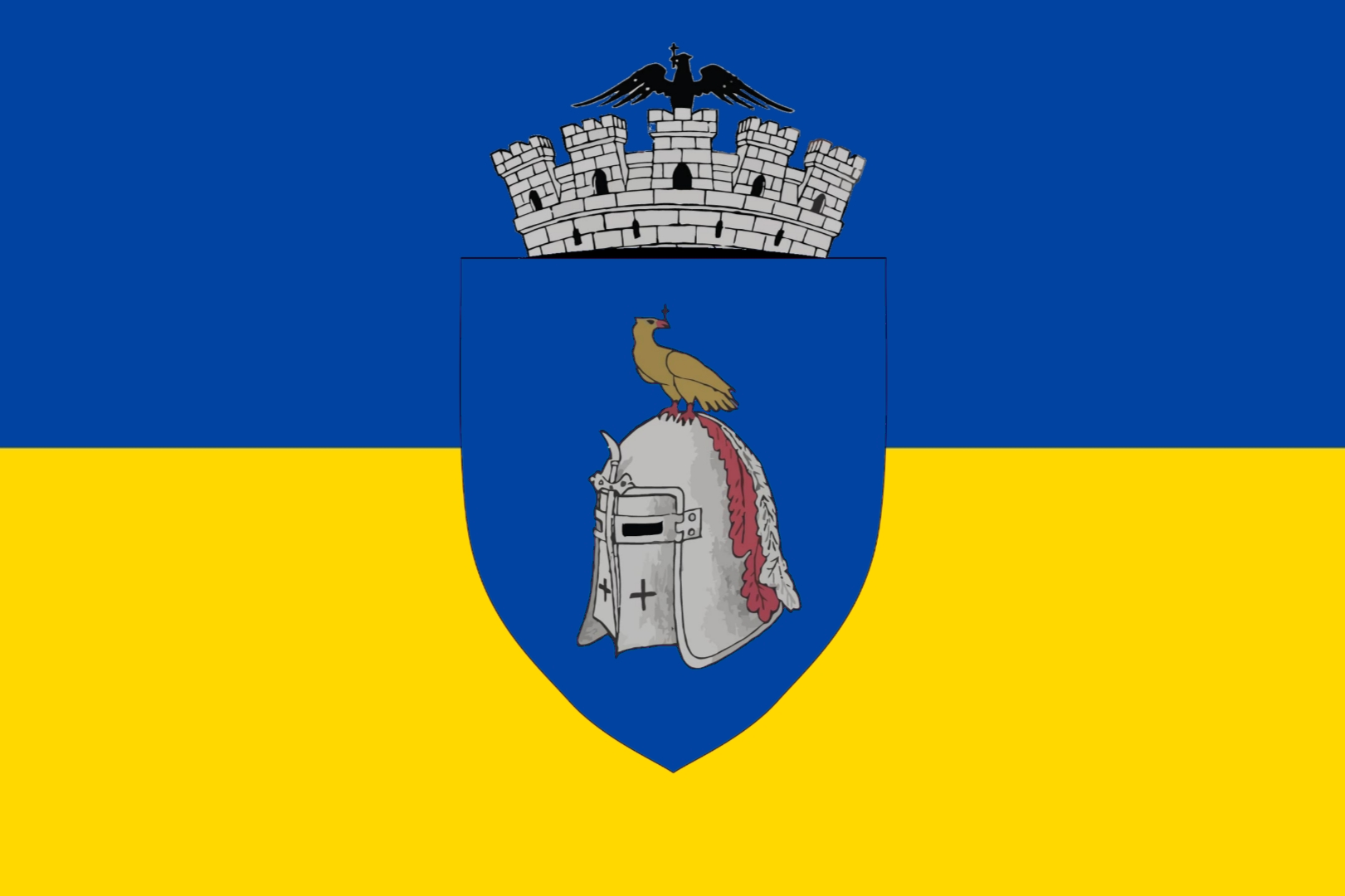
- Flag Coat of arms

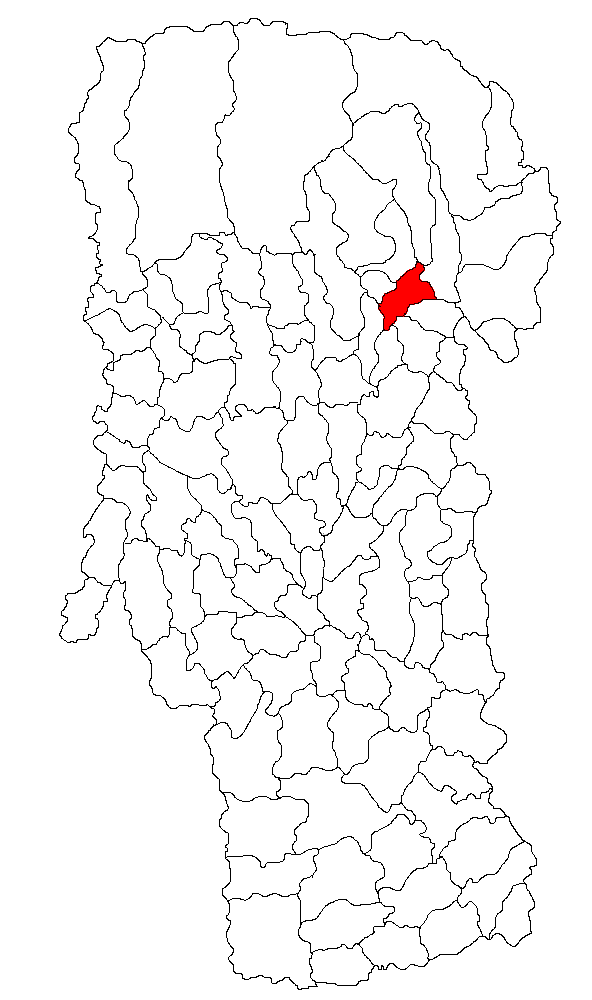
- Location in Argeș County

- Location in Romania
- Coordinates: 45°16′04″N 25°2′47″E
- Country: Romania
- County: Argeș

Government
  - Mayor (2024–2028): Elena Lasconi (USR PLUS)
- Area: 35.59 km^{2} (13.74 sq mi)
- Elevation: 600 m (2,000 ft)
- Highest elevation: 780 m (2,560 ft)
- Lowest elevation: 580 m (1,900 ft)
- Population (2021-12-01): 27,574
  - Density: 774.8/km^{2} (2,007/sq mi)
- Time zone: UTC+02:00 (EET)
  - Summer (DST): UTC+03:00 (EEST)
- Postal code: 115100
- Area code: (+40) 02 48
- Vehicle reg.: AG
- Website: www.primariacampulung.ro

Câmpulung (also spelled Cîmpulung, Romanian pronunciation: [kɨmpuˈluŋɡ], German: Langenau, Hungarian: Hosszúmező, or Câmpulung Muscel) is a city in Argeș County, Muntenia, Romania. It is attested on the Fra Mauro map from 1450 as Campo longo. It is situated among the outlying hills of the Southern Carpathians, at the head of a long well-wooded glen traversed by the river Târgului, a tributary of the river Argeș.

== History ==
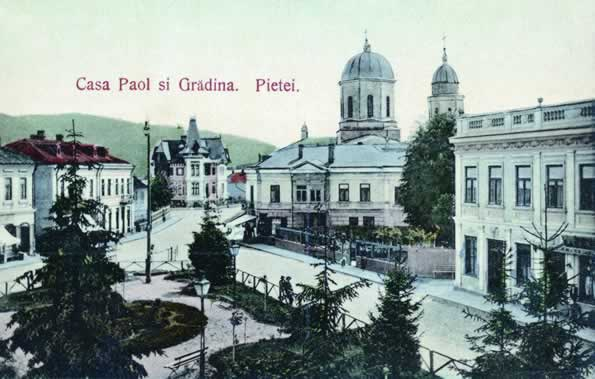
Paol House (Casa Paol) and Grădina Pieței (Garden Square) in 1906

Near Câmpulung are the remains of Jidava (or Jidova) Roman fort built around 190–211 AD on the frontier of the empire, the Limes Transalutanus; and just next to it, vestiges of a Roman colony, variously identified with Romula, Stepenium, and Ulpia Traiana. Now called Grădiștea (meaning place of a fortress in Romanian) or Jidovi.

Campulung was also important because it was only 37 km (23 mi) away from the Bran Pass, an important trade and military route for militaries and merchants.

=== Middle Ages ===
Câmpulung was the first capital of the feudal state of Wallachia which might mean that the city might have been built in the 13th century, until succeeded by Curtea de Argeș in the 14th century. There was a considerable traffic with Transylvania, over the Rucăr–Bran Pass, 24 km (15 mi) to the north, and with the south by a branch railway to Ploiești.

Câmpulung was one of the earliest urban settlements in Wallachia, the Transylvanian Saxon colonists contributing to its development by bringing the German urban culture. The earliest written evidence of the town's existence is dated 1300, and is to be found in the Câmpulung church. The inscription is an epitaph of Laurencius de Longo Campo, the full text being Hic sepultus est comes Laurencius de Longo-Campo, pie memorie, Anno Domini MCCC ("Here is buried count Laurentius of Longus-Campus, in pious memory, Anno Domini 1300"). Laurentius was most likely the person coordinating the colonization process.

The oldest known written document in Old Romanian was dated back to 1521 (Neacșu's letter). The letter was written to warn the city of Brașov of an impending Ottoman attack. The letter, written in Old Romanian, names the city in the introductory part written in Old Church Slavonic as Dlăgopole — Длъгополь (with the same meaning — "a long field").

=== Early Modern Ages ===
When the printing press started to get popular in Europe, Matei Basarab managed to bring a printing press in Câmpulung in 1635 where Orthodox books would be printed and would be sent all over the Balkan peninsula for Orthodox people. This did not last long and in 1650 there weren't records of books being printed after that.

During the reign of Șerban Cantacuzino (1678–1688), pressure was exerted to change the Catholic judges of Câmpulung to Eastern Orthodox.

Originally, the Romanians of the town did not have the same rights as the German colonists, but by the 15th century, the two communities were already merged, as shown by the new Romanian churches built near the Catholic areas and by the fact that some of the elected județs were Romanians. Another community in the town were the Bogomil Bulgarians, who settled in the Șchei neighbourhood (Șchei being an old Romanian word referring to Slavic people). Outside the town, in the south-west, on the hill currently named Câmpul mișeilor ("Field of the cripple") was a leper colony, which had its own church and mill.

Câmpulung was the first capital of the feudal state of Wallachia which might mean that the city might have been built in the 13th century, until succeeded by Curtea de Argeș in the 14th century. There was a considerable traffic with Transylvania, over the Bran Pass, 24 km (15 mi) to the north, and also with the south.

=== Modern Era ===
From the Middle Ages until 1822 Câmpulung had its own autonomy, until it was withdrawn in 1822.

At the end of the 19th century Câmpulung had a population of 11,244 people, and the main streets were called Negru Vodă, Râului, Matei Basarab, and Gruiului, running parallel to the city centre and paved with cobblestones, some of them planted with trees. There were three squares Sfântul Ilie, Șcheiul, and a Județelor; Sfântul Ilie Square was the main one. And next to the church of Sfântul Ilie there was a weekly fair there, as well as a big annual fair between 17 and 28 July.

In 1950, Muscel County was abolished and Câmpulung became a district town, the residence of the Muscel raion of the Argeș Region. In 1968, during the administrative reform, the city lost its status of regional administrative center, becoming a city of Argeș County. In 1994, Câmpulung was declared a municipality.

== Geography ==
The town is located in the northeastern part of the county, within the depression that bears its name, at an elevation of 580–780 meters (1,900–2,560 feet), in the Argeș Hills, at the foothills of the Iezer Mountains, along the banks of the Târgului River.

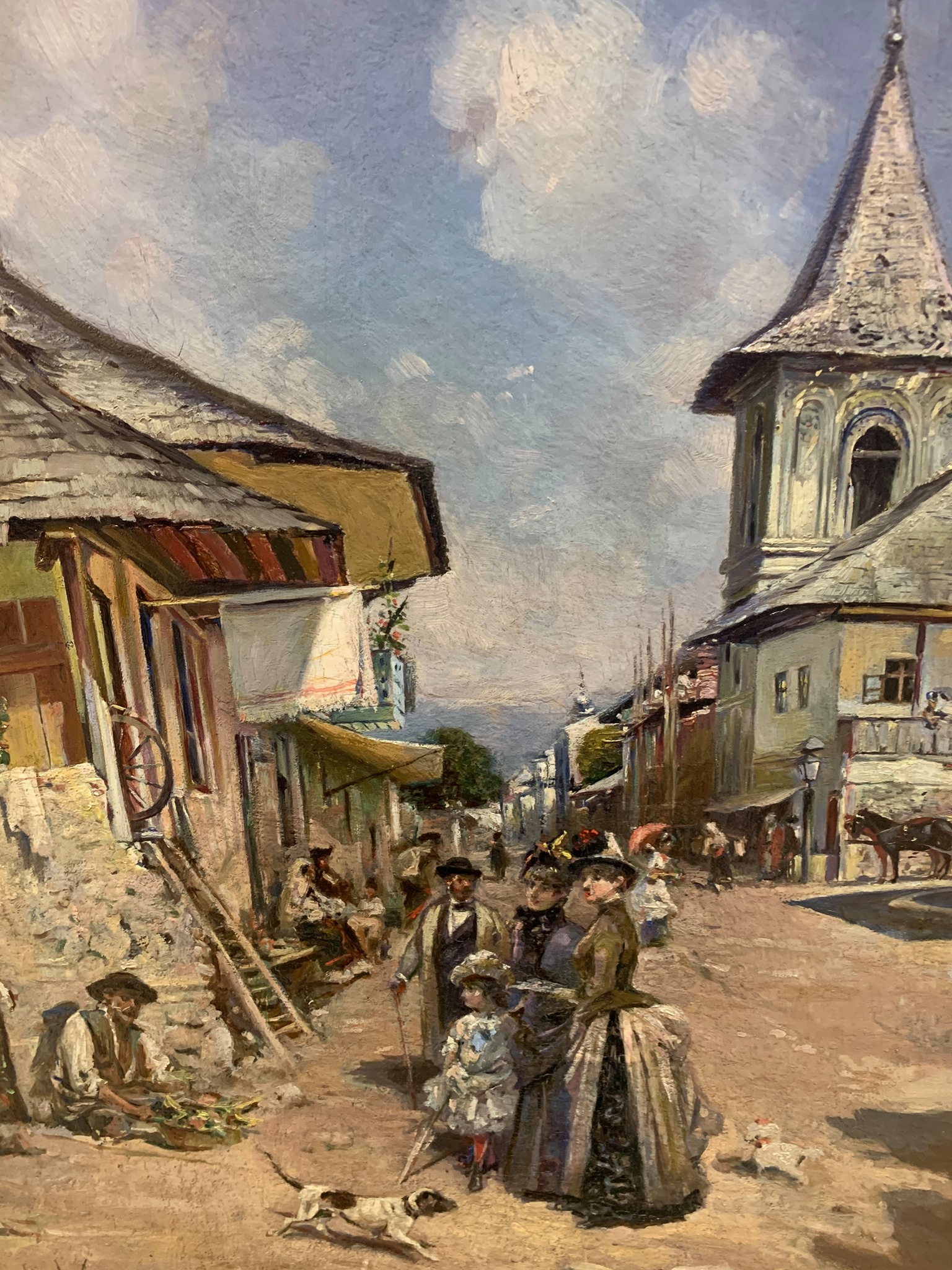
A Câmpulung street in 1890, by Theodor Aman.

Câmpulung is crossed by National Road DN73, which connects Pitești and Brașov. The town lies 52 km (32 miles) from Pitești and 84 km (52 miles) from Brașov. In Câmpulung, DN73 branches into County Road DJ737, which runs southeast to Mioarele and Boteni, where it ends at DN73D; County Road DJ734, which heads north to Lerești; and County Road DJ732C, which runs west to Bughea de Jos, Godeni (where it intersects with DN73C), and Schitu Golești, where it reconnects with DN73.

By rail, the town is served by the Câmpulung and Parc Krețulescu stations. The latter is the terminus of a railway line running south to Golești, where it joins the Bucharest - Pitești railway line.

=== Climate ===
The town has a warm-summer humid continental climate (Dfb) according to the Köppen climate classification, with a mean annual temperature of approximately 9-10 °C. During the winter months, average temperatures are below freezing. In January, the coldest month of the year, the average temperature in Câmpulung is around -1 to 0 °C.

Summers are generally mild, with relatively small year-to-year temperature fluctuations, rarely exceeding 3 °C. Spring and autumn temperatures fall between the seasonal extremes of summer and winter. Average spring temperatures range from 8 °C to 13 °C, while autumn temperatures are typically 1-3 °C higher than those recorded in spring. The annual temperature amplitude generally ranges between 8.4 °C and 12.4 °C.

Precipitation, influenced by atmospheric humidity and cloud cover, varies seasonally. The Subcarpathian region records approximately 128 overcast days per year, while Câmpulung averages 102.4 such days annually. Most precipitation falls in liquid form throughout the year. During winter, snowfall occurs on approximately 20-25 days, and snow cover typically persists for 60-80 days. Average annual precipitation ranges from 700 to 800 mm in the Poienarii de Muscel and Câmpulung areas. During drought years, precipitation levels can decline significantly below the annual average. Recorded values include 428 mm in Schitu Golești and 287 mm in Boteni. Monthly precipitation also varies, with the highest amounts typically occurring in May and June and the lowest in February.

The local relief provides a degree of shelter from prevailing winds. Wind patterns are influenced by the surrounding mountainous terrain, with air currents often channelled along the Vâlsan Valley corridor. The crivăț occasionally affects the area during severe winters.

Climate data for Câmpulung (elevation 681m, 2014–2026 normals, extremes 1981–present)
Month	Jan	Feb	Mar	Apr	May	Jun	Jul	Aug	Sep	Oct	Nov	Dec	Year
Record high °C (°F)	18.9 (66.0)	20.9 (69.6)	24.6 (76.3)	27.5 (81.5)	28.0 (82.4)	33.0 (91.4)	36.5 (97.7)	36.2 (97.2)	32.8 (91.0)	27.8 (82.0)	23.8 (74.8)	18.7 (65.7)	36.5 (97.7)
Mean daily maximum °C (°F)	4.5 (40.1)	6.6 (43.9)	10.5 (50.9)	15.3 (59.5)	19.3 (66.7)	24.4 (75.9)	26.5 (79.7)	26.8 (80.2)	21.9 (71.4)	15.8 (60.4)	9.8 (49.6)	6.1 (43.0)	15.6 (60.1)
Daily mean °C (°F)	0.0 (32.0)	1.8 (35.2)	5.2 (41.4)	9.3 (48.7)	13.5 (56.3)	18.3 (64.9)	20.1 (68.2)	20.2 (68.4)	15.8 (60.4)	10.3 (50.5)	5.6 (42.1)	2.1 (35.8)	10.2 (50.3)
Mean daily minimum °C (°F)	−4.4 (24.1)	−3.0 (26.6)	-0.0 (32.0)	3.3 (37.9)	7.7 (45.9)	12.1 (53.8)	13.7 (56.7)	13.6 (56.5)	9.7 (49.5)	4.8 (40.6)	1.4 (34.5)	−1.9 (28.6)	4.8 (40.6)
Record low °C (°F)	−23.8 (−10.8)	−22.5 (−8.5)	−19.3 (−2.7)	−7.5 (18.5)	−2.4 (27.7)	1.6 (34.9)	6.4 (43.5)	4.0 (39.2)	−2.4 (27.7)	−8.5 (16.7)	−14.2 (6.4)	−19.4 (−2.9)	−23.8 (−10.8)
Average precipitation mm (inches)	43.3 (1.70)	32.6 (1.28)	44.8 (1.76)	51.1 (2.01)	98.3 (3.87)	100.5 (3.96)	114.5 (4.51)	68.9 (2.71)	66.5 (2.62)	48.0 (1.89)	60.7 (2.39)	45.8 (1.80)	775 (30.5)
Average precipitation days (≥ 1.0 mm)	6.9	5.4	7.5	7.3	10.7	11.1	10.3	6.9	6.2	6.6	8.5	6.1	93.5
Average snowy days	8.3	7.7	4.8	1.5	0.3	0	0	0	0	0.5	3.0	5.8	31.9
Source: Meteomanz (2014-2026); Infoclimat (1980-2010); ANM

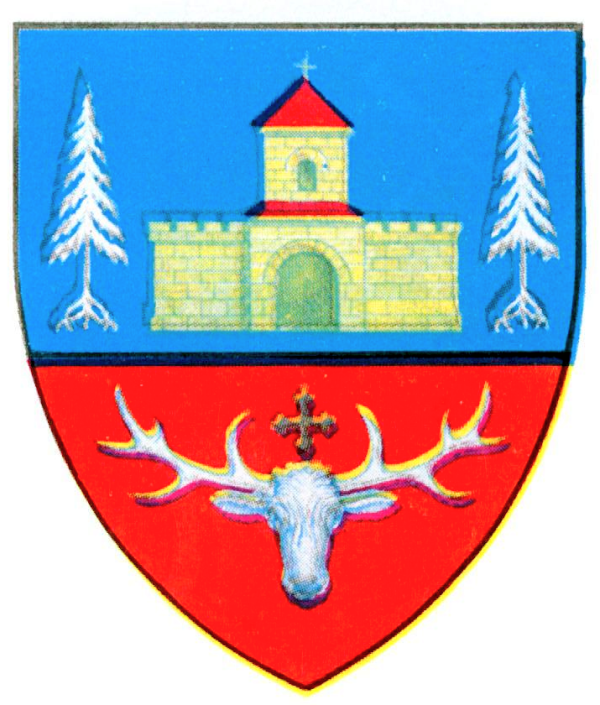
Coat of arms of Câmpulung during the interwar period.

== Census ==
Historical population
Year	Pop.	±%
1859	8,283	—
1900	13,033	+57.3%
1912	16,090	+23.5%
1930	13,868	−13.8%
1948	18,174	+31.0%
1956	18,880	+3.9%
1966	24,877	+31.8%
1977	31,533	+26.8%
1992	44,125	+39.9%
2002	38,285	−13.2%
2011	31,767	−17.0%
2021	27,574	−13.2%
Source: Census data

== Natives ==
- Theodor Aman
- Constantin D. Aricescu
- Gheorghe Arsenescu
- Ion Barbu
- George Demetrescu Mirea
- Dora Gad
- Nicolae Golescu
- Ștefan Golescu
- Radu Gyr
- Ion Jinga
- Petre Libardi
- Gabriel Moiceanu
- Tudor Mușatescu
- D. Nanu
- Ion Negulici
- George Oprescu
- Constantin Ion Parhon
- Pârvu Mutu
- Dan Simonescu
- Mihail Vlădescu

== See also ==
- The letter of Neacșu of Câmpulung
