= Râul Târgului =

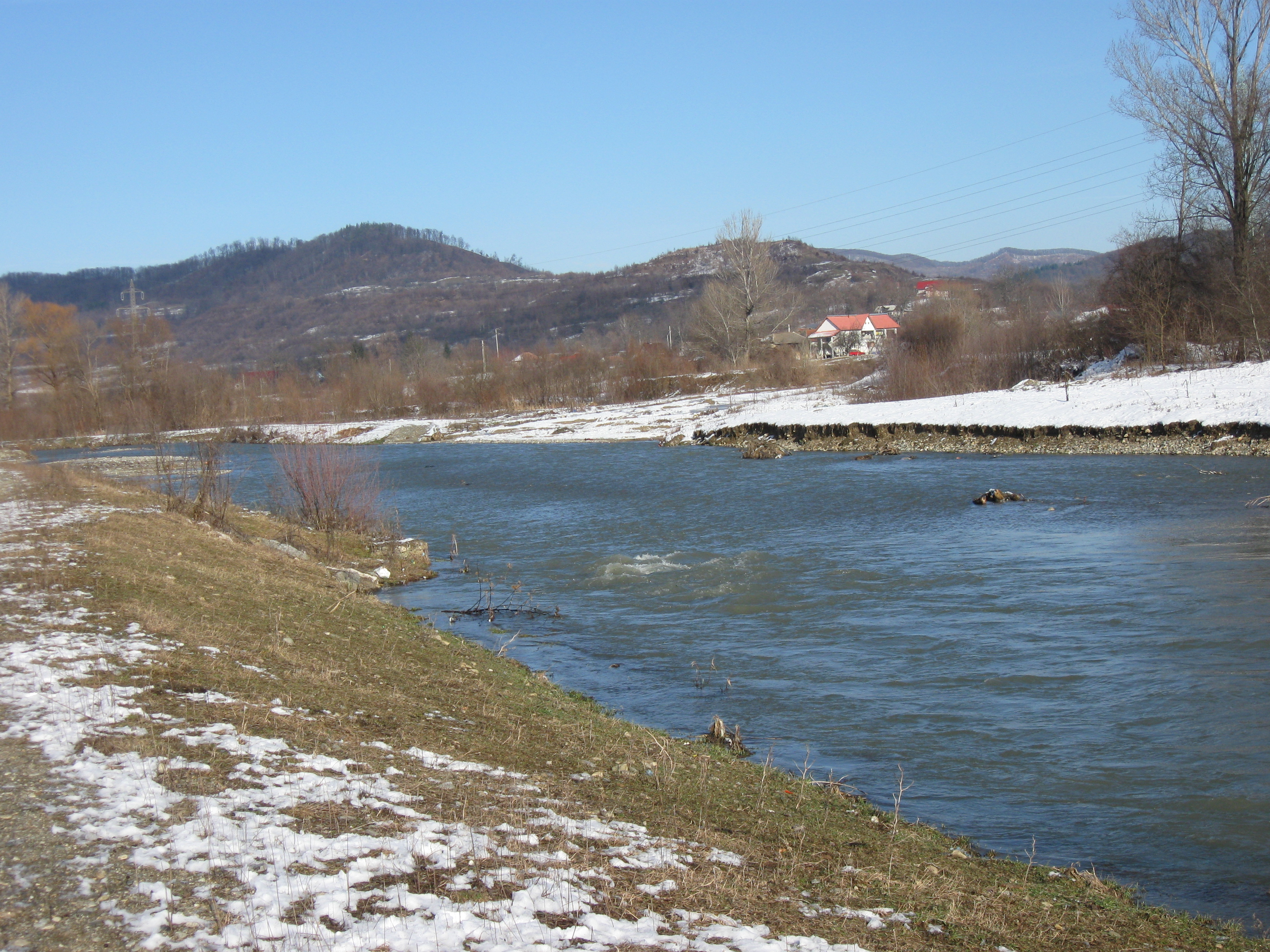

- Location within Romania

Location
- Country: Romania
- Counties: Argeș County
- City: Câmpulung

Physical characteristics
- Source: Iezer Mountains
- Mouth: Râul Doamnei
  - coordinates: 44.9463°N 24.8949°E
- Length: 72 km (45 mi)
- Basin size: 1,096 km^{2} (423 sq mi)

Basin features
- Progression: Râul Doamnei→ Argeș→ Danube→ Black Sea
- Tributaries
  - left: Argeșel
  - right: Bratia

The Râul Târgului is a left tributary of the river Râul Doamnei in Romania. Its source is near the Păpușa Peak, in the Iezer Mountains. It discharges into the Râul Doamnei between Micești and Mioveni. Its upper course, upstream from the confluence with the Bătrâna, is also called Cuca. Its length is 72 km (45 mi) and its basin size is 1,096 km^{2} (423 sq mi).

== Tributaries ==
The following rivers are tributaries to the Râul Târgului (from source to mouth):

- Left: Lespezi, Valea lui Geantă, Valea Largă, Valea Calului, Valea Călușului, Mușuroaiele, Dobriașul Mare, Valea Poienii, Dobriașul Mic, Pârâul Maricăi, Valea Rumâneștilor, Poienari, Ruda, Drăghici, Mănăstirea, Argeșel
- Right: Tambura, Frăcea, Bătrâna, Văcarea, Râușor, Valea Ursului, Bughea, Bratia
