= Iezer Mountains =

Mountain range in central Romania

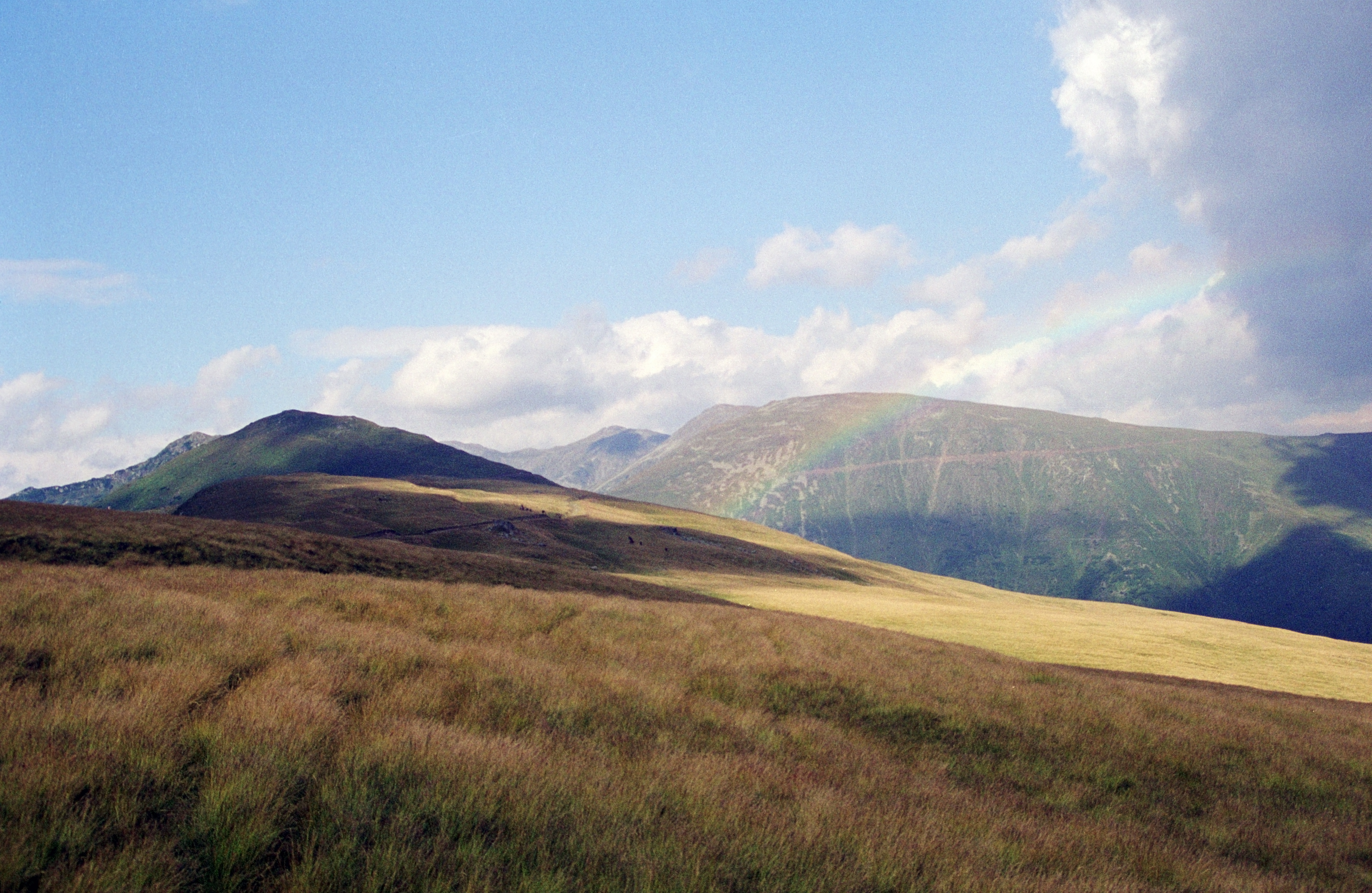
- Iezerul Mic (2409 m)

Highest point
- Peak: Roșu Peak
- Elevation: 2,470 m (8,100 ft)

Dimensions
- Area: 535 km^{2} (207 mi^{2})

Naming
- Native name: Munții Iezer (Romanian)

Geography
- Location within Romania
- Country: Romania
- Range coordinates: 45°28′N 24°57′E

The Iezer Mountains (Romanian: Munții Iezer / Munții Iezer-Păpușa) are a mountain range in the Southern Carpathians in Romania. It is part of the Făgăraș Mountains group. Its total area is 535 km^{2} (207 sq mi). Its highest elevation is 2,470 m (8,100 ft), at Roșu Peak.

== Location ==
The Iezer Mountains are located between the Făgăraș Mountains to the northwest and the Piatra Craiului Mountains to the east. The rivers Dâmbovița and Râul Târgului take their source in the Iezer Mountains. The range lies completely within Argeș County.

== Peaks ==
The highest peaks are:

- Roșu 2,470 m
- Iezerul Mare 2,462 m
- Păpușa 2,391 m

== Gallery ==
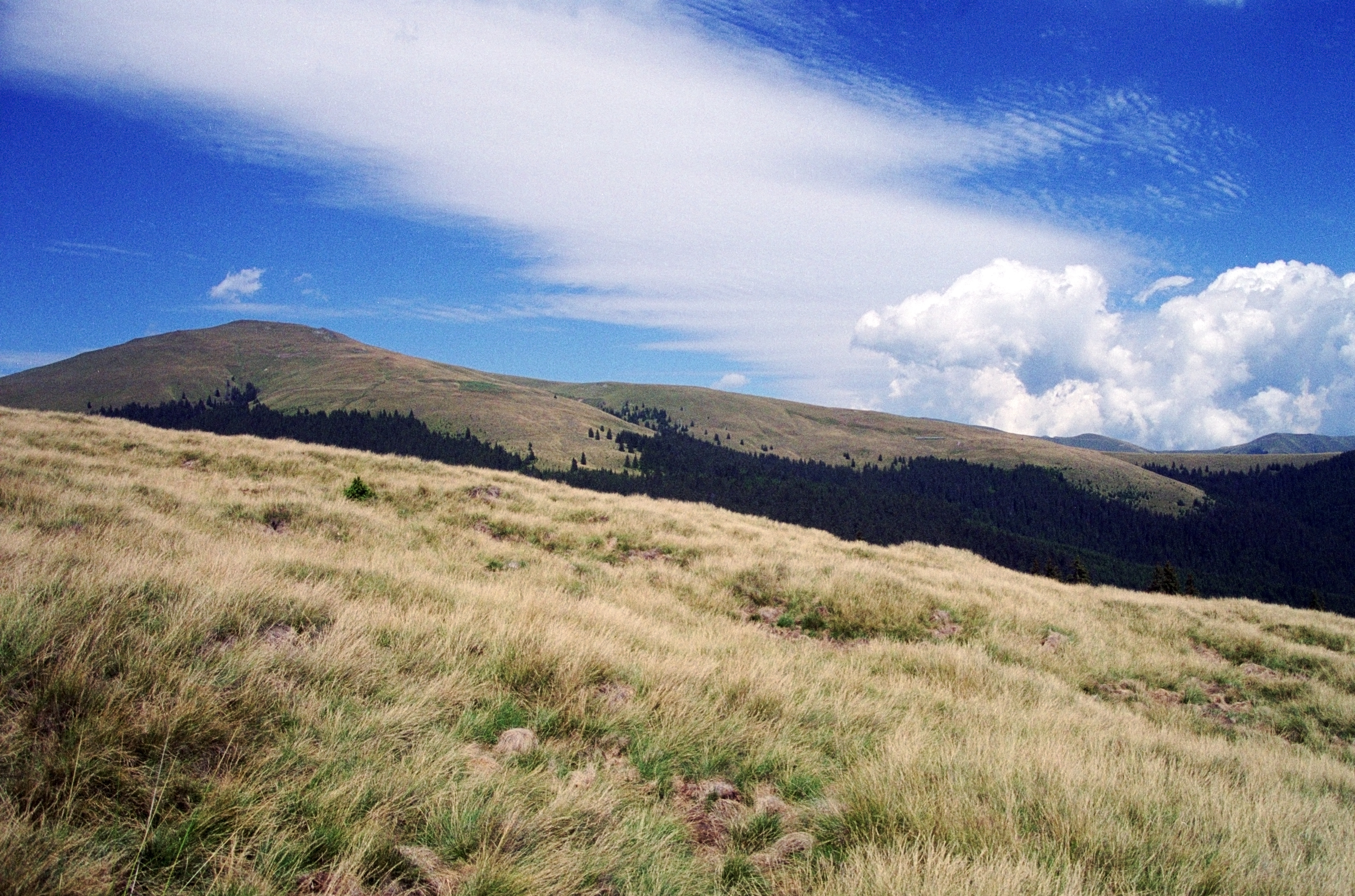
Iezer Păpușa - Papau mountain

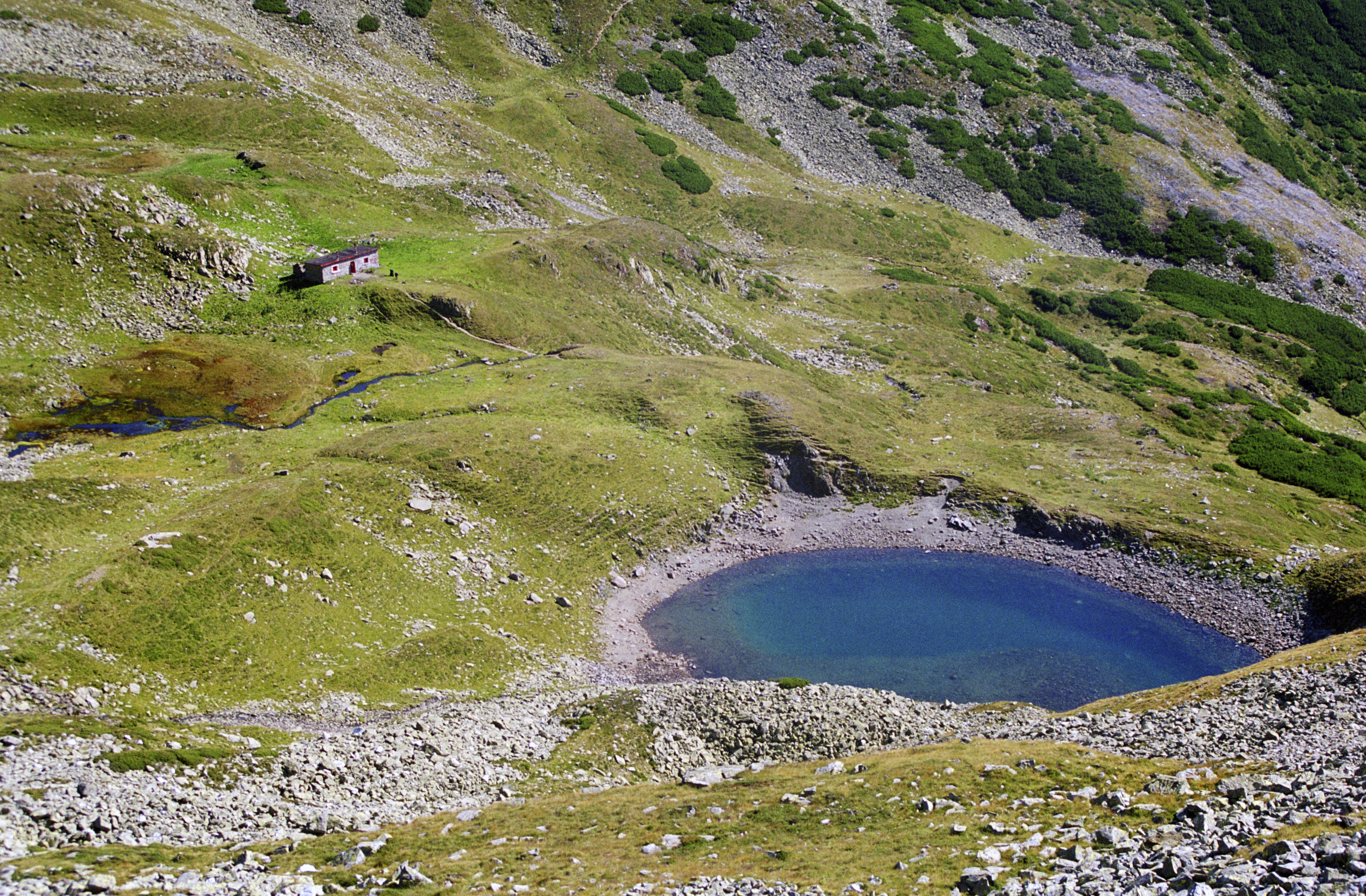
Lake Iezer and the nearby shelter

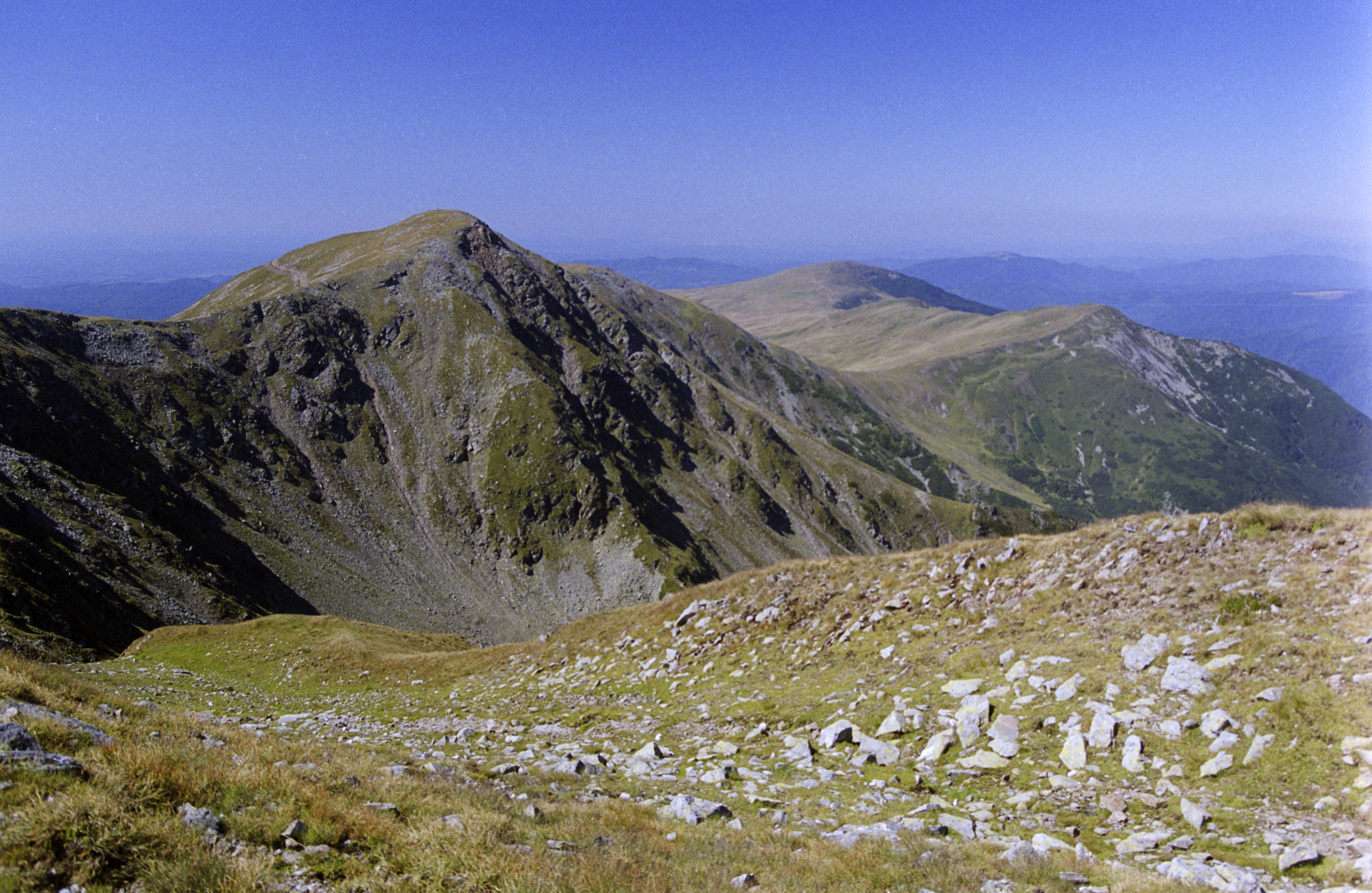
The main ridge

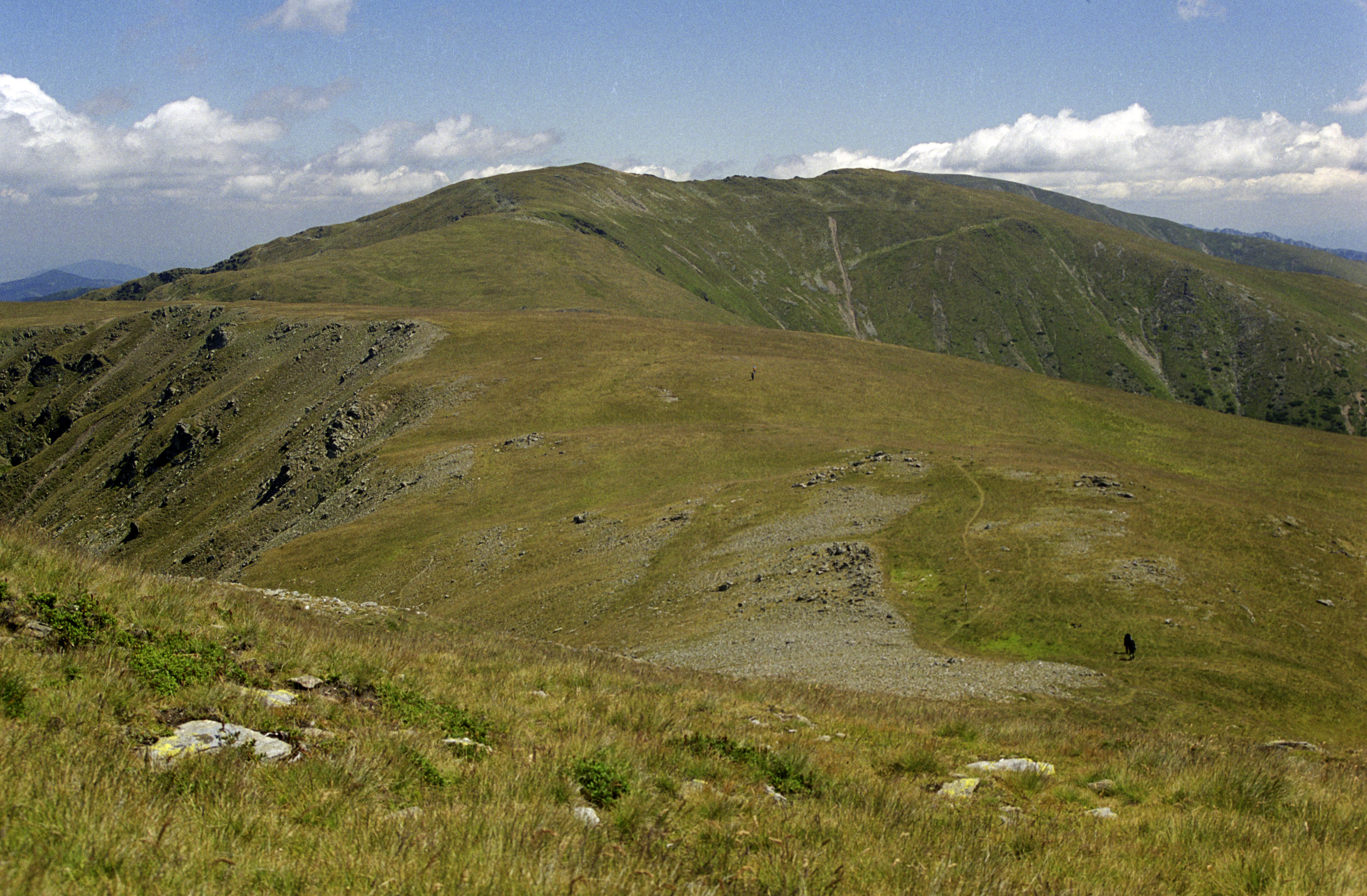
The main ridge of Iezer Păpușa

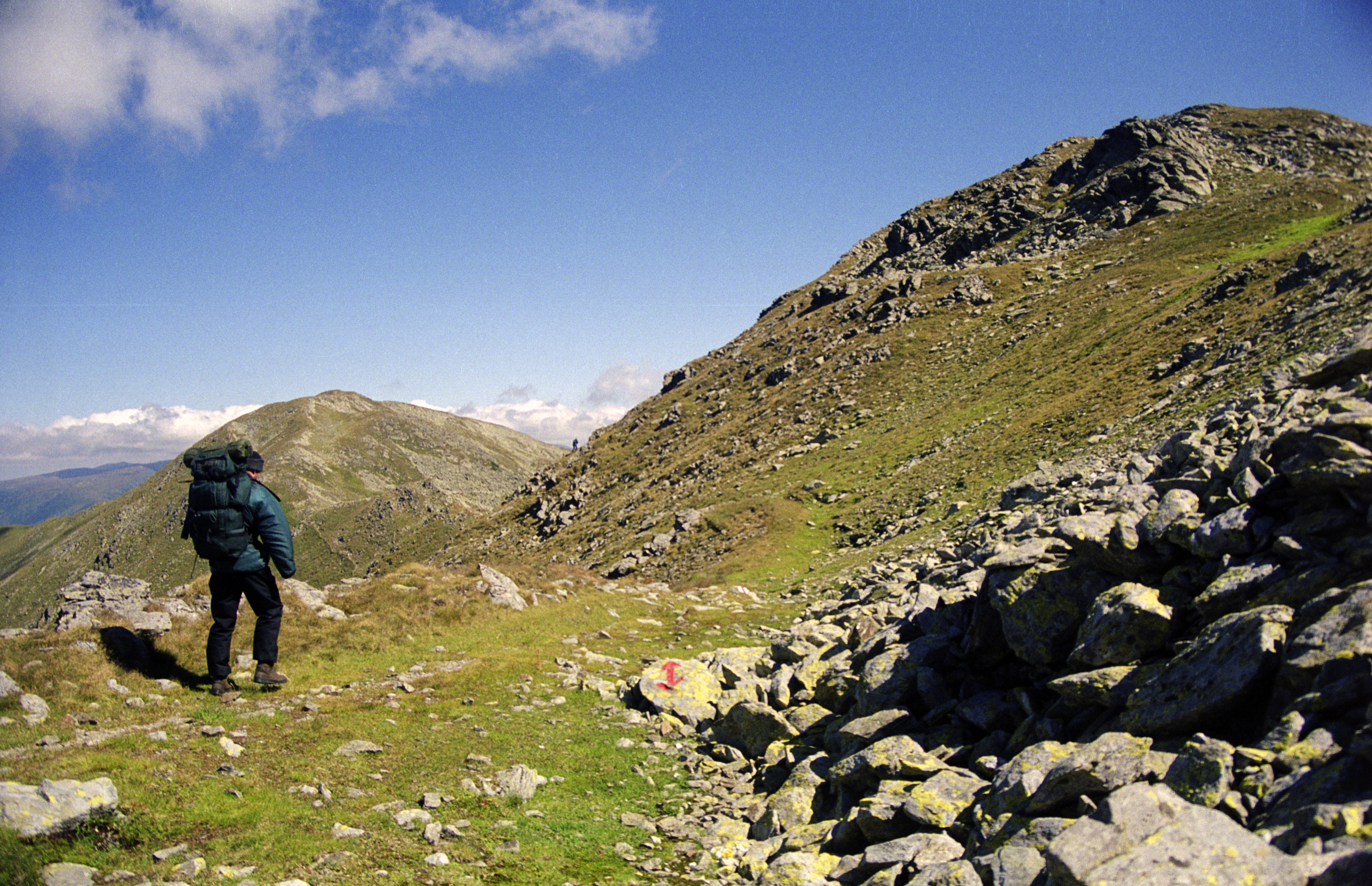
Iezer Păpușa

Iezer – Păpuşa, 3D
