= Battle of Dragoslavele =

World War I battle

- Part of the Battle of the Southern Carpathians of the Romanian Campaign of World War I
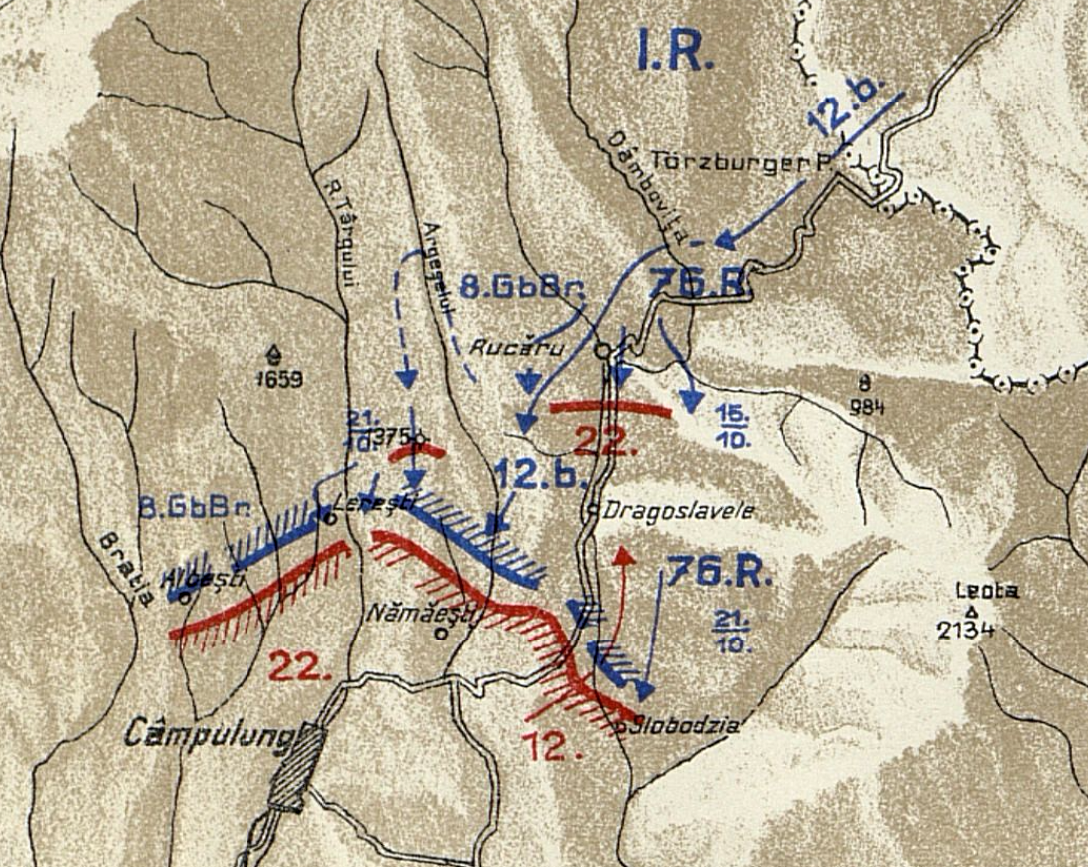
- Map of the area of operations
Date	26–27 October 1916
Location	Dragoslavele, Romania
Result	Romanian victory

Belligerents
Romania	German Empire; Austria-Hungary

Commanders and leaders
(Kingdom of Romania) Nicolae Petala	(German Empire) Curt von Morgen

Units involved
1st Army: 12th Division; 22nd Division	I Reserve Corps

Casualties and losses
Unknown	300 prisoners (27 October)

The Battle of Dragoslavele was a military engagement fought between Romanian forces on one side and Central Powers forces (Germany and Austria-Hungary) on the other. It was part of the Romanian Campaign of World War I. The battle resulted in a Romanian victory and the effective end of Central Powers advances in the area.

== Background ==
The Central Powers forces in the area were represented by Curt von Morgen's I Reserve Corps, a mixed combat group with German and Austro-Hungarian units. The Romanian forces consisted in elements of the Romanian 1st Army, namely the 12th and 22nd Divisions. The 12th Division had been part of the 1st Army since the beginning of the campaign, while the 22nd Division had only recently been assigned to the 1st Army. The 1st Army was at that time commanded by General Nicolae Petala, who had replaced General Ioan Dragalina on 25 October, after the latter was wounded in action. Von Morgen had succeeded in clearing the Bran/Törzburg Pass by 12 October. However, there was a second ridge to the south of Câmpulung, meaning that the road into Wallachia would be open only when the town and the heights beyond it had been captured.

== Battle ==
On 14 October, the Austro-Hungarian 8th Mountain Brigade of von Morgen's I Reserve Corps seized Rucăr, south of the Bran/Törzburg Pass. Marching through roadless, rugged terrain, the Austro-Hungarians caught the inexperienced Romanian 12th and 22nd Divisions by surprise, and turned their flank. On 26 October, Morgen's forces attacked violently near Dragoslavele, but were repulsed by the Romanians. On 27 October, the Romanians counter-attacked at Dragoslavele, taking 300 prisoners.

== Aftermath ==
Von Morgen's efforts to press on faltered at Dragoslavele. Although his Corps was a tantalizing 8 miles from Câmpulung, Morgen's forces would make little further progress throughout the following month. Having retaken the initiative in this sector of the front, the Romanians pressed on their attack and - on the following day (28 October) - recaptured the village of Lerești. The village had been taken by the Central Powers a short while prior.

Câmpulung was finally taken on 29 November, but not because the Romanian defenses faltered. Despite repeated attacks, the Germans had failed to break through the Romanian lines. However, not allowing its western flank to be enveloped, the Romanian 1st Army retreated towards the east, and the unbroken Romanian defenses had to be abandoned one by one. Ultimately, it was the advance from the west of other German troops that finally allowed Morgen's forces to occupy Câmpulung.

Von Morgen argued that much more of the Romanian Army could have been captured if a breakthrough had been achieved at Câmpulung. He insisted that this would have achieved "a real victory, a Cannae, a Tannenberg".

== Mausoleum ==
The Mausoleum of Mateiaș, also known as the Heroes' Mausoleum, is a monument dedicated to the Romanian soldiers who fought in World War I. The ossuary houses the remains of over 2,100 soldiers in 31 crypts. Built in 1928–1935, the mausoleum is located on Mateiaș Hill, in Valea Mare-Pravăț commune. Nearby passes European route E574 (DN73), which goes from Câmpulung, 11 km (6.8 mi) to the southeast, towards Dragoslavele, 7 km (4.3 mi) to the north, and on through the Rucăr-Bran Pass to Brașov.

== Bibliography ==
- Kirițescu, Constantin (1922). Istoria războiului pentru întregirea României: 1916–1919 (in Romanian). Bucharest: România Nouă. OCLC 935411585.
- Ioanițiu, Alexandru (1928–1929). Războiul României: 1916-1918 (in Romanian). Bucharest: Tipografia Geniului. OCLC 1079085090.
- Serviciul istoric, Ministerul Apărării Naționale Marele Stat Major (1934). România în războiul mondial 1916-1919 Documente - Anexe (in Romanian). Vol. I. Bucharest: Monitorul Oficial și Imprimeriile Statului. OCLC 312195823.
- Olteanu, Constantin (1984–1989). Istoria militară a poporului român (in Romanian). Bucharest: Editura Militară. OCLC 1087515443.
- Milea, Vasile; Atanasiu, Victor (1987). Istoria războiului pentru întregirea României: 1916–1919 (in Romanian). Bucharest: Editura Militară. OCLC 18616519.
- Atanasiu, Victor (1979). România în primul război mondial (in Romanian). Bucharest: Editura Militară. OCLC 164613813.
- Cioflină, Dumitru (1996). Marele Cartier General al armatei române: documente, 1916-1920 (in Romanian). Bucharest: Editura Machiavelli. OCLC 38234407.
