= Dragoslavele =

- Commune
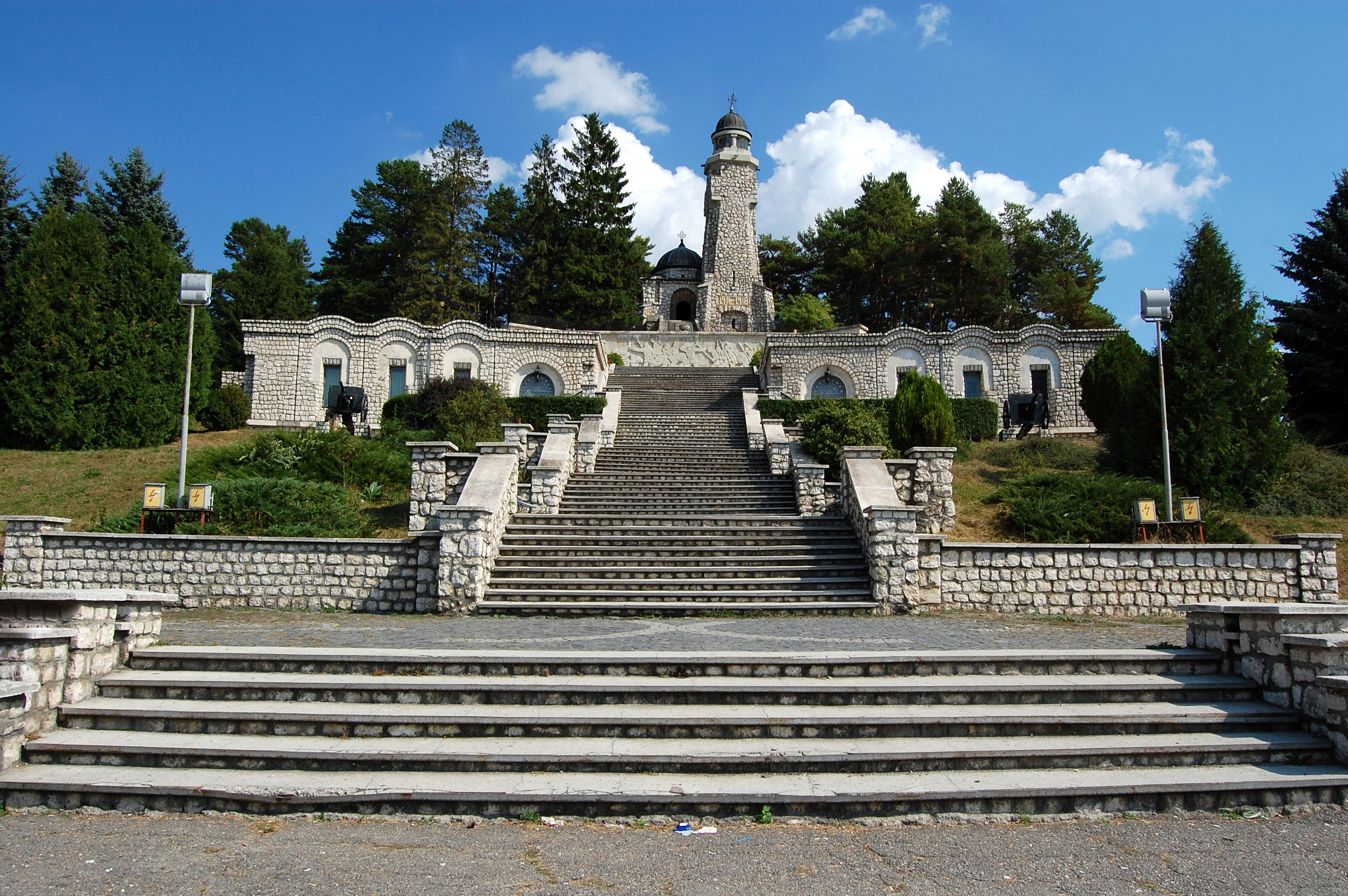
- The Mateiaș Mausoleum

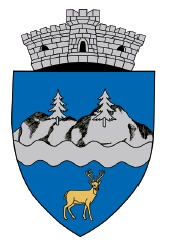
- Coat of arms

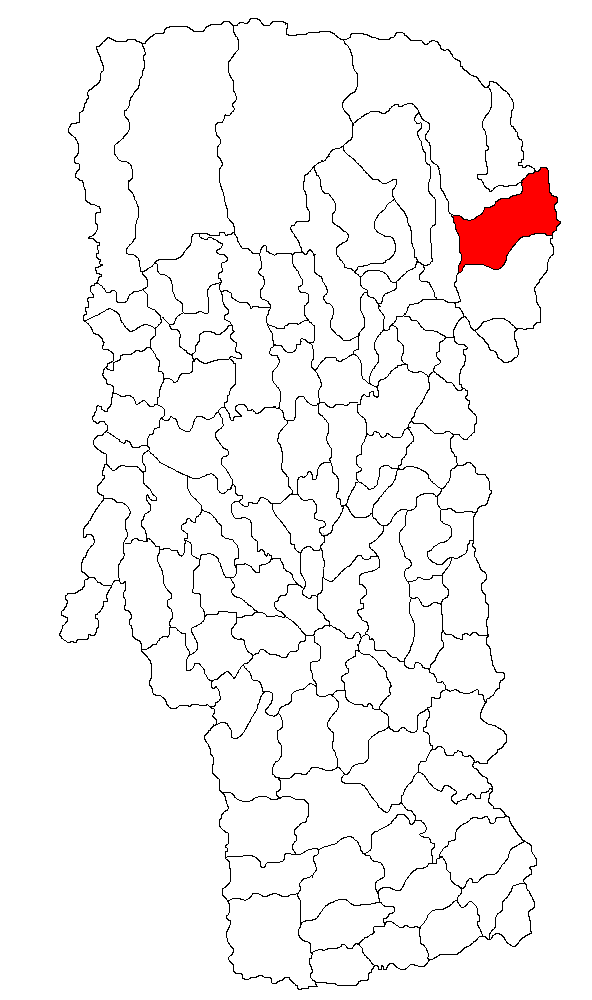
- Location in Argeș County

- Location in Romania
- Coordinates: 45°21′N 25°10′E
- Country: Romania
- County: Argeș

Government
  - Mayor (2024–2028): Ion Băcioiu (PNL)
- Area: 11.973 km^{2} (4.623 sq mi)
- Elevation: 657 m (2,156 ft)
- Population (2021-12-01): 2,474
  - Density: 206.6/km^{2} (535.2/sq mi)
- Time zone: UTC+02:00 (EET)
  - Summer (DST): UTC+03:00 (EEST)
- Postal code: 117375
- Area code: +(40) 248
- Vehicle reg.: AG
- Website: www.cjarges.ro/en/web/dragoslavele

Dragoslavele is a commune in the northern part of Argeș County, Muntenia, Romania, located by the former border between Wallachia and Transylvania, on the Wallachian side. It is a relatively important location for boarding house tourism. The commune is composed of two villages, Dragoslavele and Valea Hotarului.

== Geography ==
The commune lies at the bottom of the Southern Carpathians' slopes, at one end of the Rucăr-Bran Pass (the narrow valley separating the Piatra Craiului and Bucegi mountains), on the banks of the Dâmbovița River.

Dragoslavele is located 18 km (11 mi) from Câmpulung and 73 km (45 mi) from the county seat, Pitești. To the north and northeast it borders the communes of Rucăr and Dâmbovicioara, to the south with the commune of Stoenești, and to the west with the commune of Valea Mare-Pravăț. It is crossed by the national road DN73, which connects Pitești to Brașov. At Dragoslavele, the county road DJ725 branches off from the national road, leading south to the commune of Stoenești, where it ends in DN72A.

== History ==
From the Middle Ages until 1916, Dragoslavele was an important border crossing point between Wallachia and Transylvania.

In a commercial privilege confirming the relations with Brașov, on 20 January 1368, Vladislav I, Lord of Wallachia, also known as "Vlaicu Vodă", mentioned that merchants paid "customs at Câmpulung, or near". In 1413, Mircea the Elder renewed the old customs and fairs from Câmpulung and mentioned "the customs from Dâmbovița". The name is mentioned in documents from the Brașov archive, and in a document from 1451, where Vladislav II referred to Dragoslavele and Rucăr. In 1510, Vlad voivode wrote about the "carpenters" from Dragoslavele. The historian Nicolae Iorga located Posada in the Dragoslavele-Bran area and estimated that Charles Robert's troops passed through there in 1330. This is also where King Sigismund came in 1395; after "giving a deed near the village called Câmpulung", he was beaten in battle, according to the same historian, by the troops of Vlad-Vodă.

Documents from the 17th century show that the people of Dragoslavele were in charge of guarding the border, had properties outside the village boundaries, and were exempted from taxes through princely charters. Around 1641–1642, new residents came from the Hațeg area, called "rudari", meaning goldsmiths. The term "rudar" comes from the Slavic word "ruda", or (golden) rock.

Also in the 17th century, Vintilă Vornicul enslaved the inhabitants of the settlement but, through the intercession of Matei Basarab, they redeemed themselves with 3,000 gold coins. The stone cross in the center of the village, a cross from 1642, consecrates this event, and in 1647 the same voivode mentioned on 10 April "the royal customs from Rucăr and Dragoslavele", the latter having 12 more villages under its command "until Cotenești, Nucșoara, Slănic, Albești, Lerești, and Nămăiești".

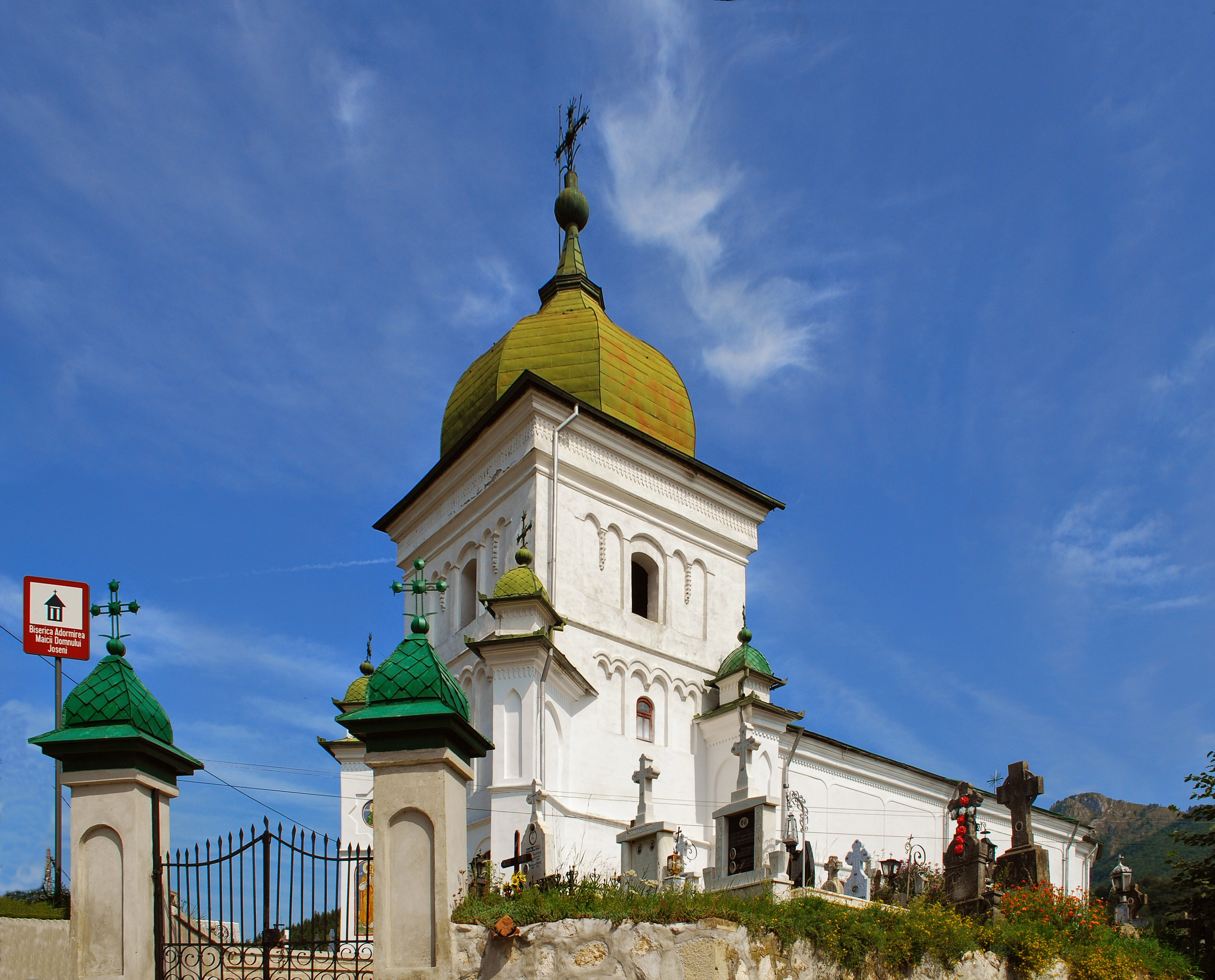
Church of the Dormition ("Joseni") in Dragoslavele

At the end of the 19th century, the commune was part of the Dâmbovițan area of Muscel County and consisted only of the village of residence, with 1,104 inhabitants. Two churches and a school functioned in the commune. The Socec yearbook from 1925 records it in the same area, with 1,864 inhabitants in the villages of Dragoslavele and Valea Caselor and in the hamlets of Fundata and Lunca Gârții.

During World War I, in October 1916, the area between Dragoslavele and Mateiaș was the scene of a particularly violent battle between Romanian Army and German Army forces (see Romania during World War I).

During World War II, Dragoslavele was a place of refuge for the Polish Marshal Edward Rydz-Śmigły, at that time Commander-in-chief and General Inspector of the Armed Forces, considered "the second man in the state after the President". On 7 September 1939, along with most of the government, he left Warsaw under attack from Nazi Germany, and ten days later, when Soviet forces attacked Poland from the east, realizing that the fight against the two aggressors is impossible, Śmigły-Rydz ordered the Polish troops to retreat to Romania, avoiding the fight with the Red Army. Having managed to avoid capture by German or Soviet troops, Śmigły-Rydz crossed into Romania on 18 September 1939, along with the government, the Polish treasury and the remnants of the army. During his exile in Romania, Rydz-Śmigły was officially interned in the summer villa of the Patriarch Miron Cristea in Dragoslavele, by one of his friends, the former Romanian Prime Minister Armand Călinescu, but he remained free. The Marshal of Poland was accommodated in the patriarchal villa in Dragoslavele until 10 December 1940, when he fled, clandestinely crossed the borders with Hungary and Slovakia, returning to Poland.

In 1950, the commune was transferred to the Muscel district of Argeș region. In 1968, it moved to Argeș County.

== Demography ==
The ethnic composition of the Dragoslavele commune (2011)
1. Romanians: 1,989 (76.1%)
2. Roma: 555 (21.2%)
3. Unknown: 69 (2.64%)
The confessional composition of the Dragoslavele commune (2011)
1. Orthodox Christians: 2,339 (89.5%)
2. Gospel Christians: 174 (6.66%)
3. Jehovah's Witnesses: 13 (0.50%)
4. Roman Catholics: 11 (0.42%)
5. Evangelists: 3 (0.11%)
6. Unknown: 73 (2.79%)

According to the census carried out in 2011, the population of Dragoslavele commune amounted to 2,613 inhabitants, increasing compared to the previous census in 2002, when 2,549 of inhabitants were registered. The majority of the inhabitants were Romanians (76.12%), with a minority of Roma (21.24%); for 2.64% of the population, the ethnicity was unknown. At the 2021 census, Dragoslavele had a population of 2,474; of those, 66.37% were Romanians and 23.32% Roma.

== Natives ==
- Gheorghe Butoiu (born 1968), football player and manager
- Ioan Răuțescu (1892–1974), Orthodox priest and historical monographist

== See also ==
- Battle of Dragoslavele
- Mausoleum of Mateiaș
- Dragoslavele Hermitage
