= Dragoslavele Hermitage =

Monument and Hermitage site in Dragoslavele, Argeș County, Romania

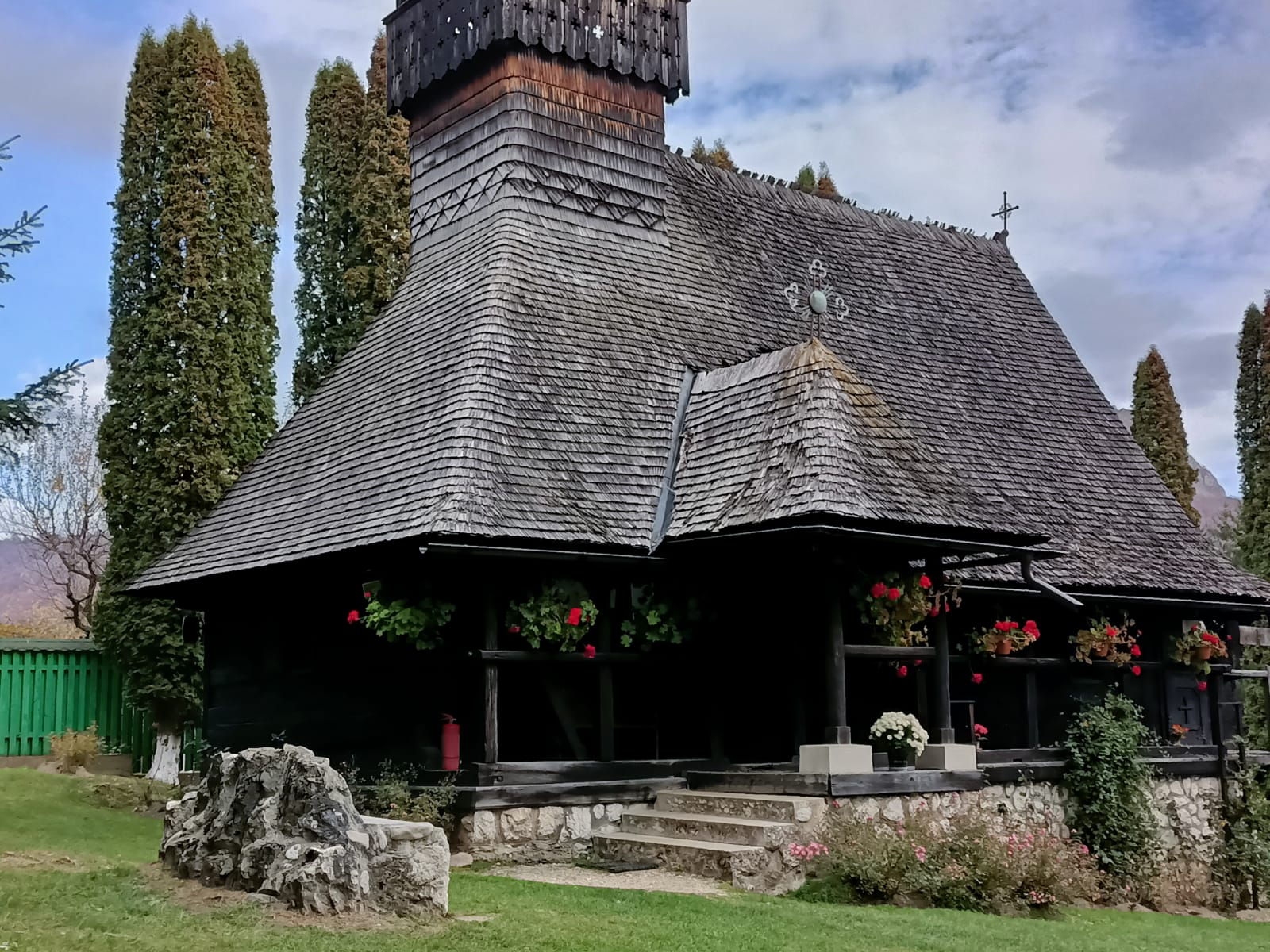
- Wooden church at Dragoslavele (Argeș County)

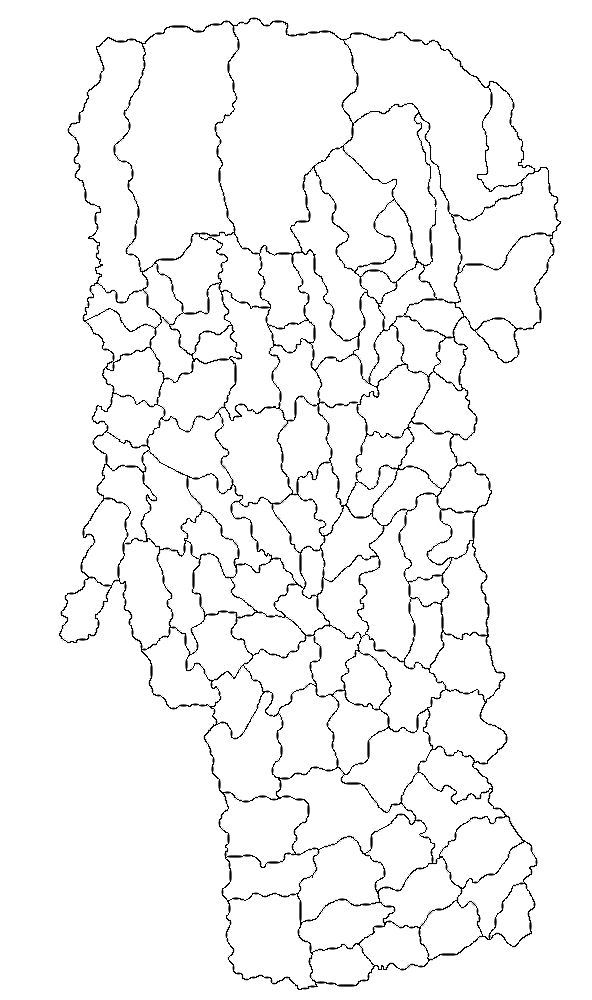
- Location within Romania Location within Argeș County
- Location: Dragoslavele, Argeș County, Romania
- Coordinates: 45°20′54″N 25°9′33″E
- Built: 1717
- Architect: Atanasie Popa

Dragoslavele Hermitage (LMI code AG-II-m-B-13680) is a historical and religious monument, dedicated to the Great Martyr "Saint George", located in Dragoslavele commune in Argeș county, on the Pitești-Brașov road, near the Rucăr-Bran Pass. Monks live here, under the pastorate of the Hieromonk Cosma Juncu.

The monastic complex includes:

- The wooden church "St. George" of the Dragoslavele Hermitage (code: AG-II-m-A-13679)
- The patriarchal residence (code: AG-II-m-B-13680), including:
  - The old house (AG-II-m-B-13680.01);
  - The new house (code AG-II-m-B-13680.02);
  - Several annexes (code: AG-II-m-B-13680.03) as well as a park (code: AG-II-m-B-13680.04).

On the previously mentioned route, tourists can also visit the nunnery in Nămăiesti. The convent is located north of the village, on a hill, in a large yard with hay and fruit trees.

Dragoslavele can be reached from Câmpulung Muscel by public transport buses.

== Brief history ==
The wooden church "Saint George" of the Dragoslavele Hermitage was built in the 18th century, around 1717, in Transylvania, at Luna de Sus, Florești commune. The foundation of the hermitage belongs to Atanasie Popa, and the painting inside the holy place of worship is attributed to the painter Nistor Zugravul from Feleac, being consecrated in 1842, by the Orthodox Bishop Vasile Moga. In 1933, the church was relocated to Predeal, and installed in the "Straja Țării" youth camp, founded by King Carol II. In 1948, the church was transferred to the Podișor hill in Dragoslavele, near the Rucăr-Bran Pass, and it was consecrated on August 21, 1949, becoming a hermitage of monks.

The monastic settlement was established in 1929 as a patriarchal summer residence for the priesthood in Muscel County. The Romanian Orthodox Patriarch Iustinian Marina brought the magnificent wooden church from Predeal, restored the walls surrounding the park and the three existing houses. He also established the actual Dragoslavele hermitage, by donating the holy church together with the buildings and adjoining lands; religious services are currently held on Sundays and holidays.

The church is placed on a high stone plinth, has walls of wooden beams on the outside, a massive wooden door, and the interior is divided into an altar, nave and porch. The holy monastic place is covered with wood shingles, and the tall spire also serves as a belfry.

Within this hermitage, a school of Christian music functioned between the 1950s and 1960s.

It should be mentioned that in the courtyard of the Dragoslavele hermitage there is the grave of the construction engineer Dimitrie G. Dima, the builder of the bridges over the Doamnei and Argeș rivers, of the electric plant in Pitești, of numerous villas, public utility buildings, of the wooden bridge over the river Dâmbovița and other numerous buildings.

== Architecture ==
The church of the Dragoslavele hermitage is built according to a rectangular plan, with a polygonal apse, a veranda on the southern side, as well as a portico – a roof extension supported by two pillars placed in front of the main entrance. Above the pronaos, a large quadrangular spire was built, covered with wood shingles, as well as a balustraded gazebo and pierced arches; the roof is pyramidal with a square base. The traditional wooden decoration (spirals, rosettes, tree of life) adorns the framework of the main access, the balustrade of the tower gazebo (ornaments) as well as at the wooden bars of the porch.

== Paintings ==
The painting of the church is made in tempera without binder, on a thin support of slaked lime, applied to wood or strips of woven fabric, and covers the entire surface between the wooden beams of the walls as well as the vault. The painting, with an accentuated graphic style, is naive.

== Gallery ==
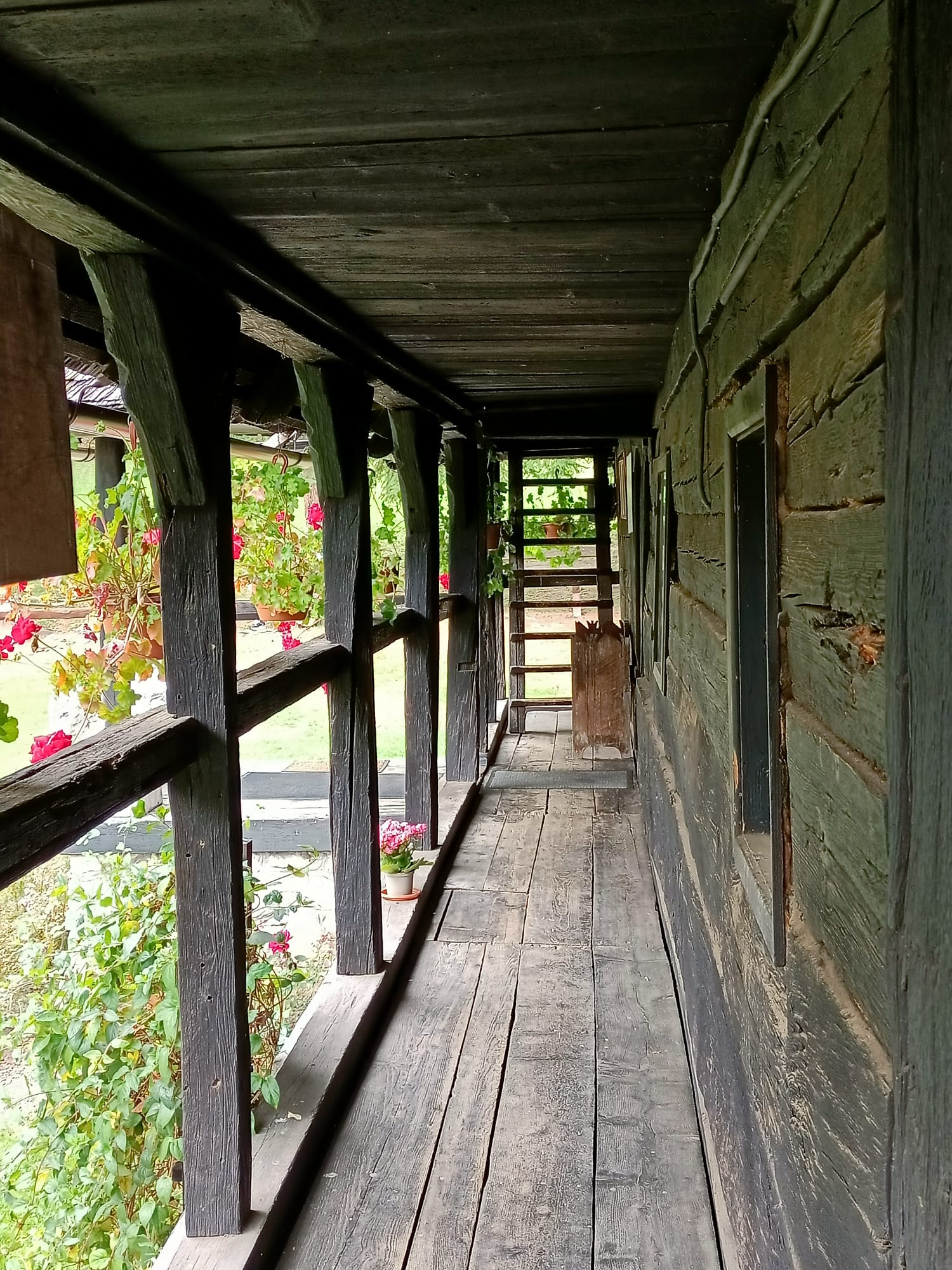
The wooden veranda

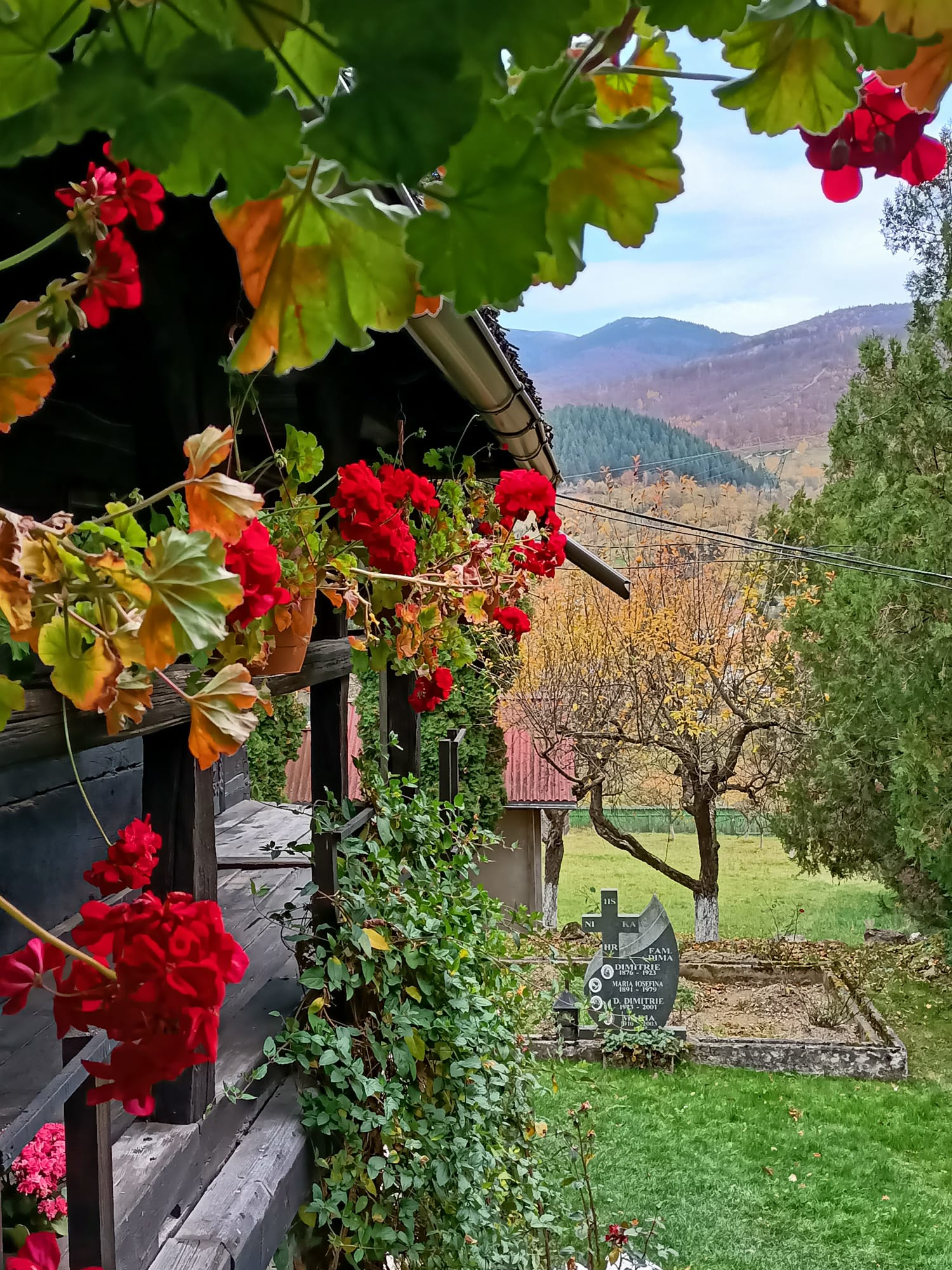
Flowers

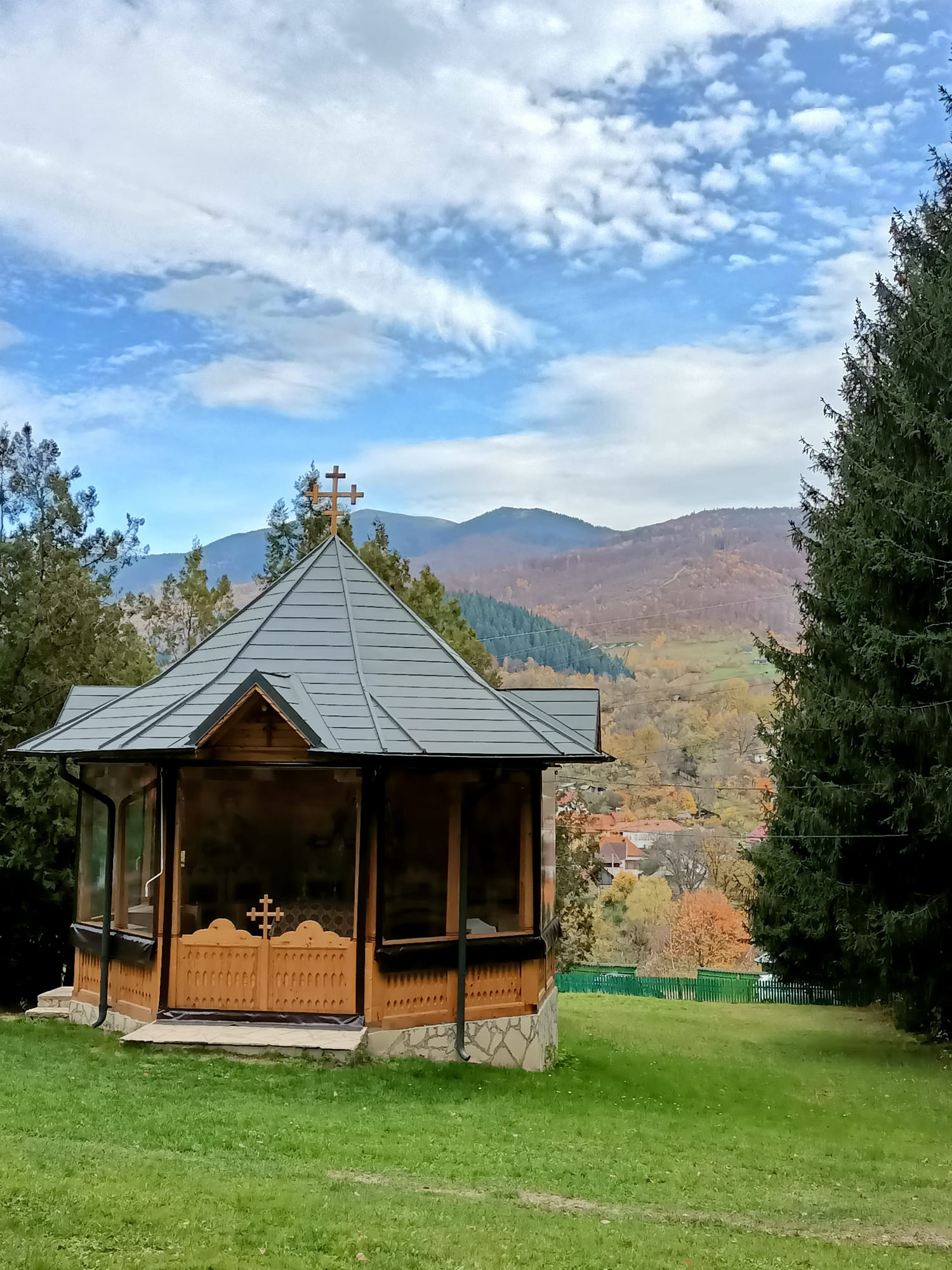
Garden view

== Bibliography ==
- Dumitrache Florești, Vasile (2002). Mitropolia Munteniei și Dobrogei. Eparhii, mânăstiri și schituri [The Metropolitanate of Muntenia and Dobrogea. Dioceses, monasteries and hermitages] (in Romanian). București: Editura Saeculum I.O.
- Bărbulescu, Augustus Constantin (2011). Catalogul monumentelor istorice din județul Argeș [Catalog of historical monuments in Argeș county] (in Romanian). Geamăna: Editura Tiparg.
- Tascovici, Radu (2015). Schituri și mănăstiri argeșene [Hermitages and monasteries of Arges] (in Romanian). Editura Arhiepiscopiei Argeșului și Muscelului.
- Constantinescu, Grigore (2011). Argeșul monumental. Enciclopedie patrimonială [The monumental Argeș. Patrimonial encyclopedia] (in Romanian). Editura Alean.
- Apostol, Ion (1990). "Reședința patriarhală de la Dragoslavele" [The patriarchal residence at Dragoslavele]. revista "Glasul Bisericii", Anul XLIV, nr. 3-4 (in Romanian).
- România de la Argeș [Romania from Argeș] (in Romanian). Editura Arhiepiscopiei Argeșului și Muscelului. 2017.
