= Dâmbovicioara =

- Commune
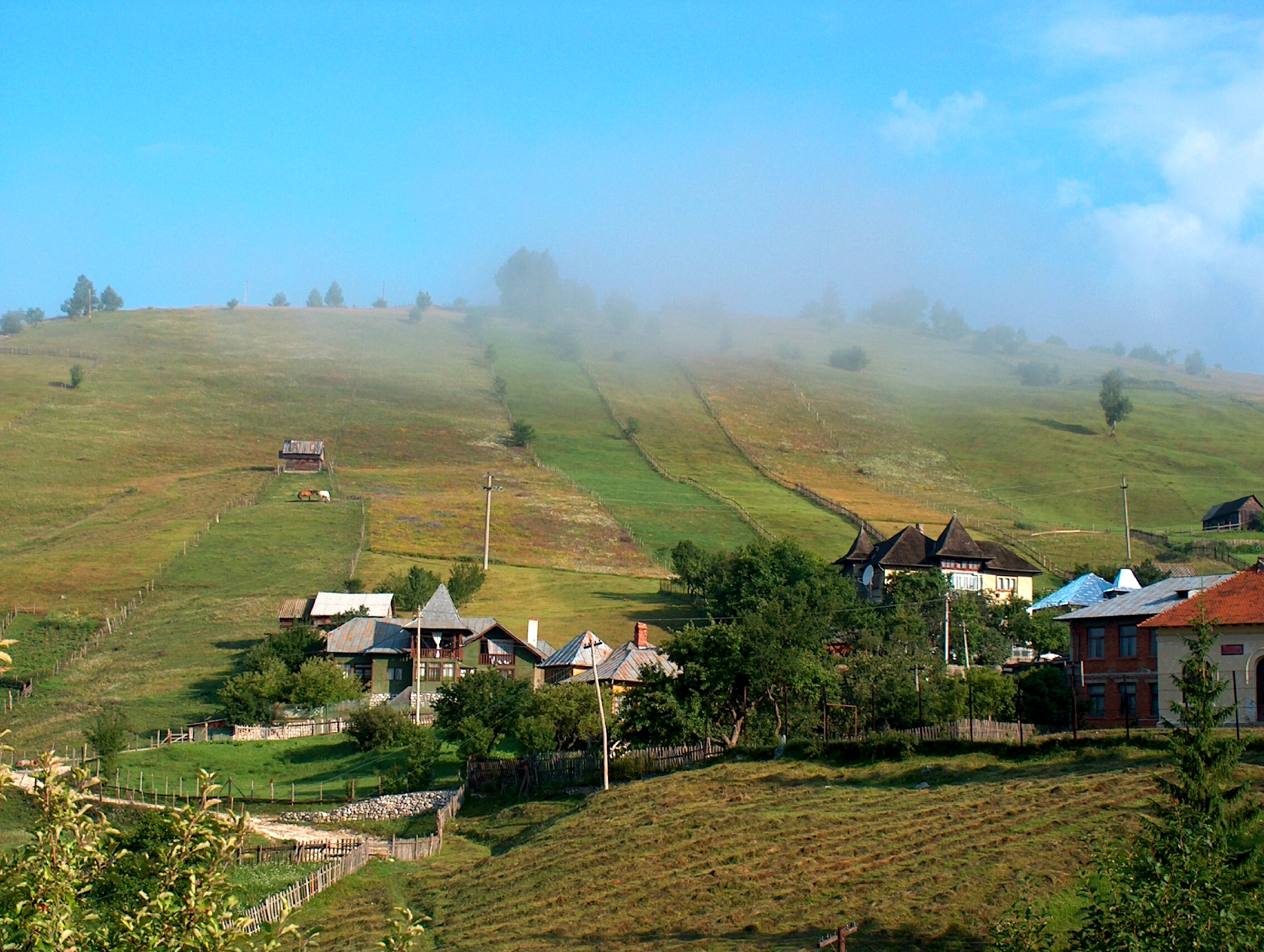

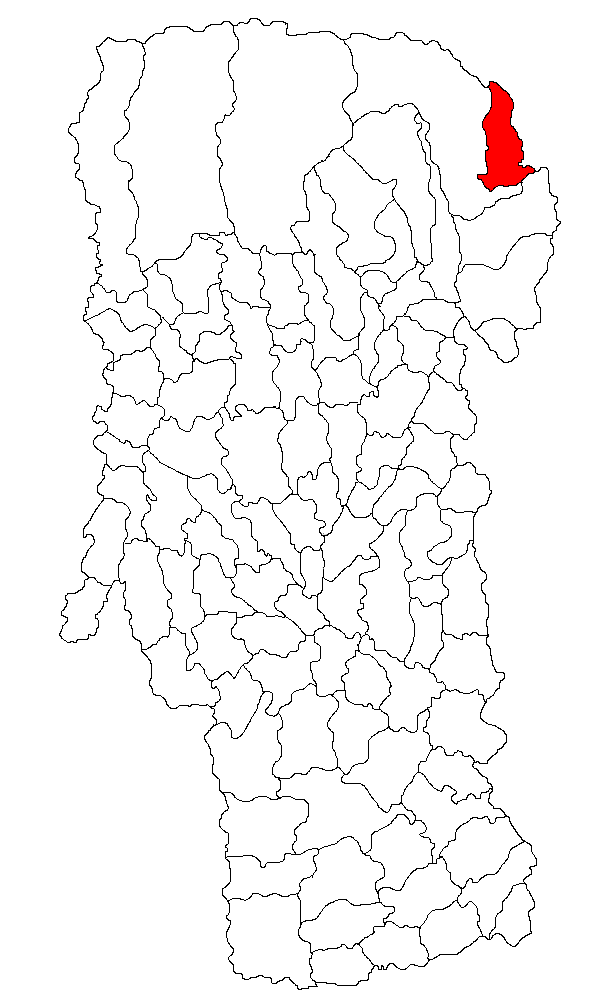
- Location in Argeș County

- Location in Romania
- Coordinates: 45°26′N 25°13′E
- Country: Romania
- County: Argeș

Government
  - Mayor (2020–2024): Dumitru Secăreanu (PSD)
- Area: 63.07 km^{2} (24.35 sq mi)
- Elevation: 904 m (2,966 ft)
- Highest elevation: 1,200 m (3,900 ft)
- Population (2021-12-01): 815
  - Density: 12.9/km^{2} (33.5/sq mi)
- Time zone: UTC+02:00 (EET)
  - Summer (DST): UTC+03:00 (EEST)
- Postal code: 117355
- Vehicle reg.: AG
- Website: primaria-dambovicioara.ro

Dâmbovicioara is a commune in Argeș County, Muntenia, Romania. It is composed of three villages: Ciocanu, Dâmbovicioara, and Podu Dâmboviței.

== Geography ==
Nestled on the southern slopes of the Southern Carpathians, the commune is located in the northeastern extremity of Argeș County, on the border with Brașov County. It is crossed by national road DN73, which connects the county seat, Pitești, 86 km (53 mi) to the southwest, to the municipality of Brașov, 52 km (32 mi) to the northeast.

The Dâmbovița River has its source in Podu Dâmboviței, on the Curmătura Oticului, a mountain pass that separates the Iezer Mountains from the Făgăraș Mountains.

== Villages ==
=== Dâmbovicioara ===
Dâmbovicioara is the village of residence of the commune of the same name. It has a population of 298 inhabitants.

=== Podu Dâmboviței ===
Podu Dâmboviței is a village with 745 inhabitants, located on DN73, at a distance of 29 km (18 mi) from Câmpulung. The village mentioned was for the first time in the 16th-17th centuries.

=== Ciocanu ===
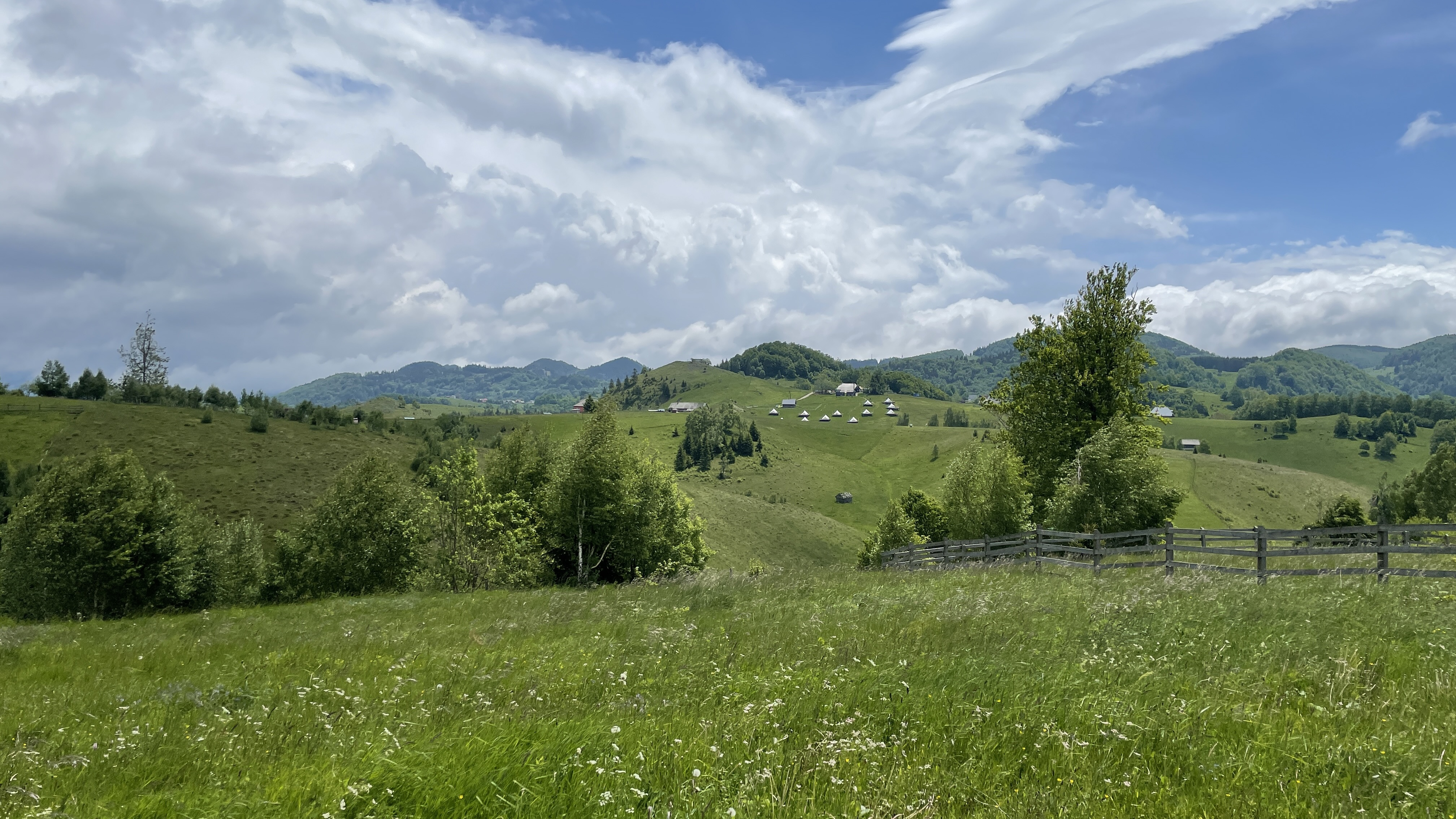
View of Ciocanu

==== Geography ====
The village’s name, meaning "the hammer", derives from its shape, with the tip pointing towards Dâmbovicioara village. It is surrounded by the Bucegi, Piatra Craiului, and Leaota mountains.

The village is located at the northern edge of the commune, at the foot of the Piatra Craiului Mountains, on the Rucăr-Bran Pass. To the north, the next village is Șirnea, part of Transylvania.

==== History ====
Ciocanu was founded and named around 1850 by Iosif Căciulă, Teche Poponeci, and Bucur Stinghe, three deserters from the Imperial Austrian Army who purchased land from the elders of Rucăr. Until the Union of Transylvania with Romania, it was a border village in the Romanian Old Kingdom, with Austria-Hungary on the other side. The crossing was known as the "cuckoo border", because like the bird that flew freely between, it was quite permeable, with the inhabitants prospering from the traffic.

The border is a natural one, with its location along a mountain crest. In ancient times, it divided Thracian tribes of shepherds and farmers. A document of 1377 mentions this saddle as the first customs point over the mountains, under the name Ruffa Abor. In the late 16th century, Doamna Florica, the daughter of Michael the Brave, took possession of the village, in turn granting property to the Rucăr elders.

In 1916, during the early stages of Romania’s participation in World War I, the area was the scene of heavy fighting (see Battle of Dragoslavele). Reportedly, prior to the war, a German spy posing as a hunter had photographed the Romanian military’s local strategic defenses.

== Gallery ==
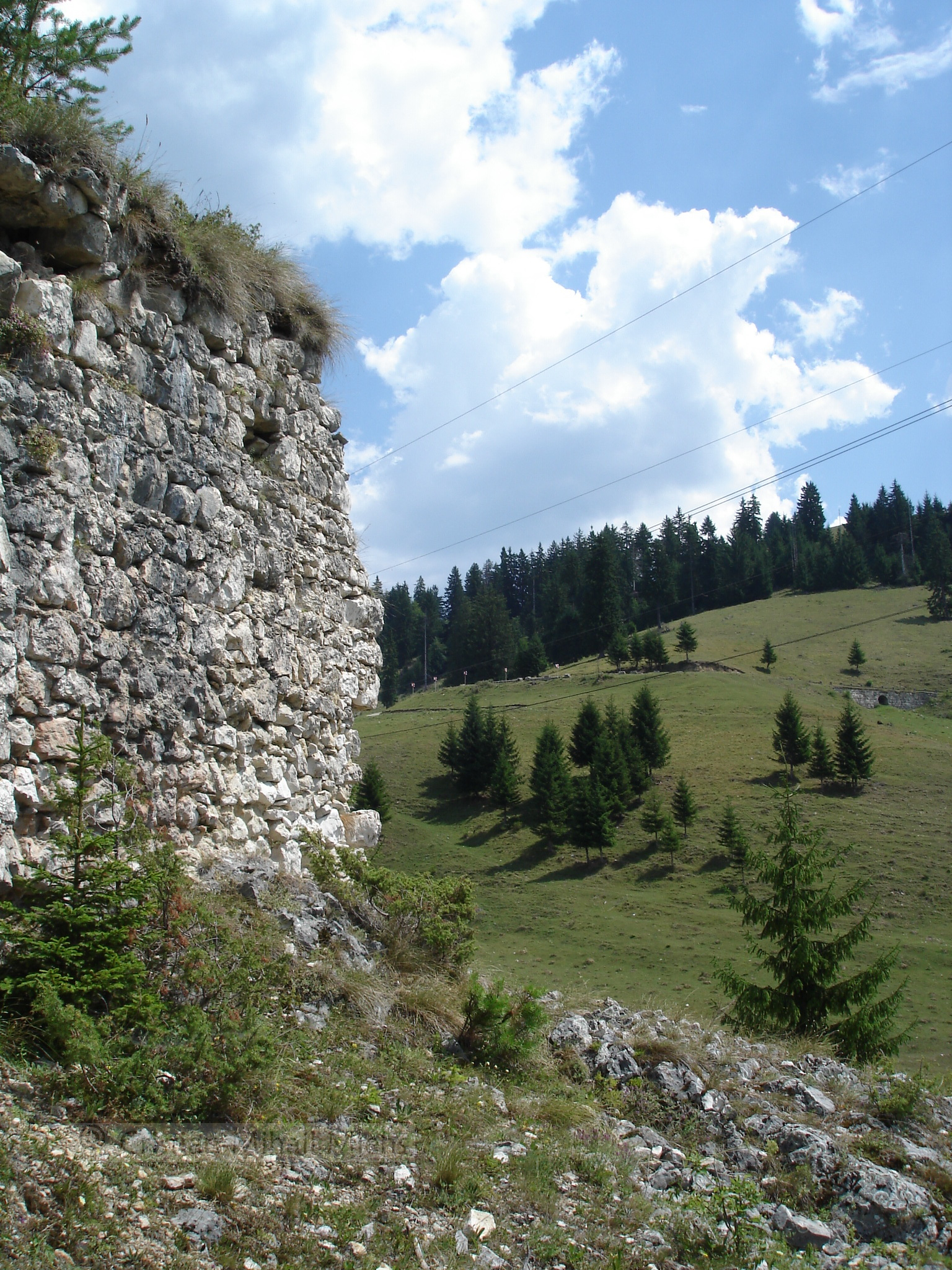
Oratea Fortress in Podu Dâmboviței, where Vlad the Impaler was once imprisoned

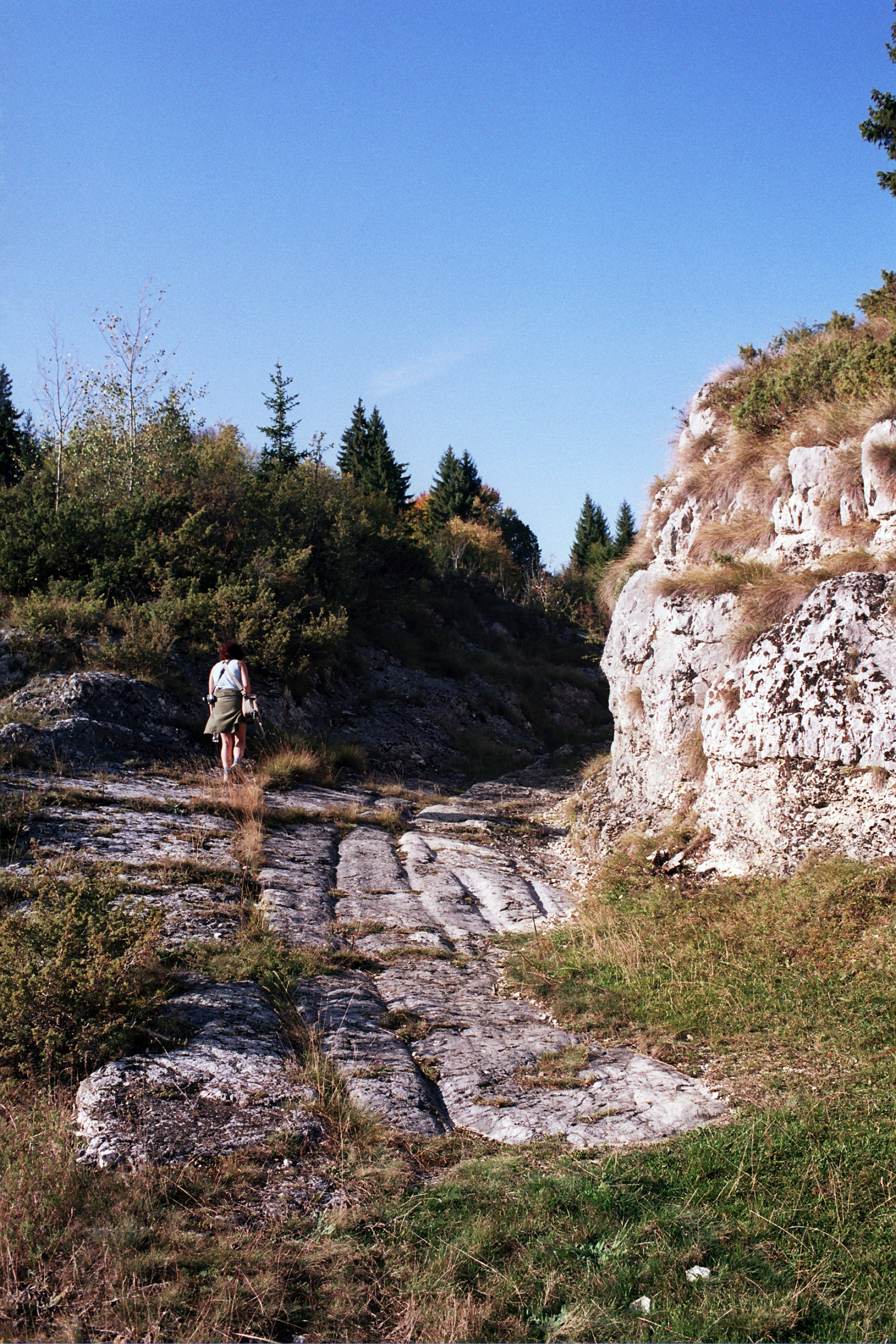
Roman road in Podu Dâmboviței

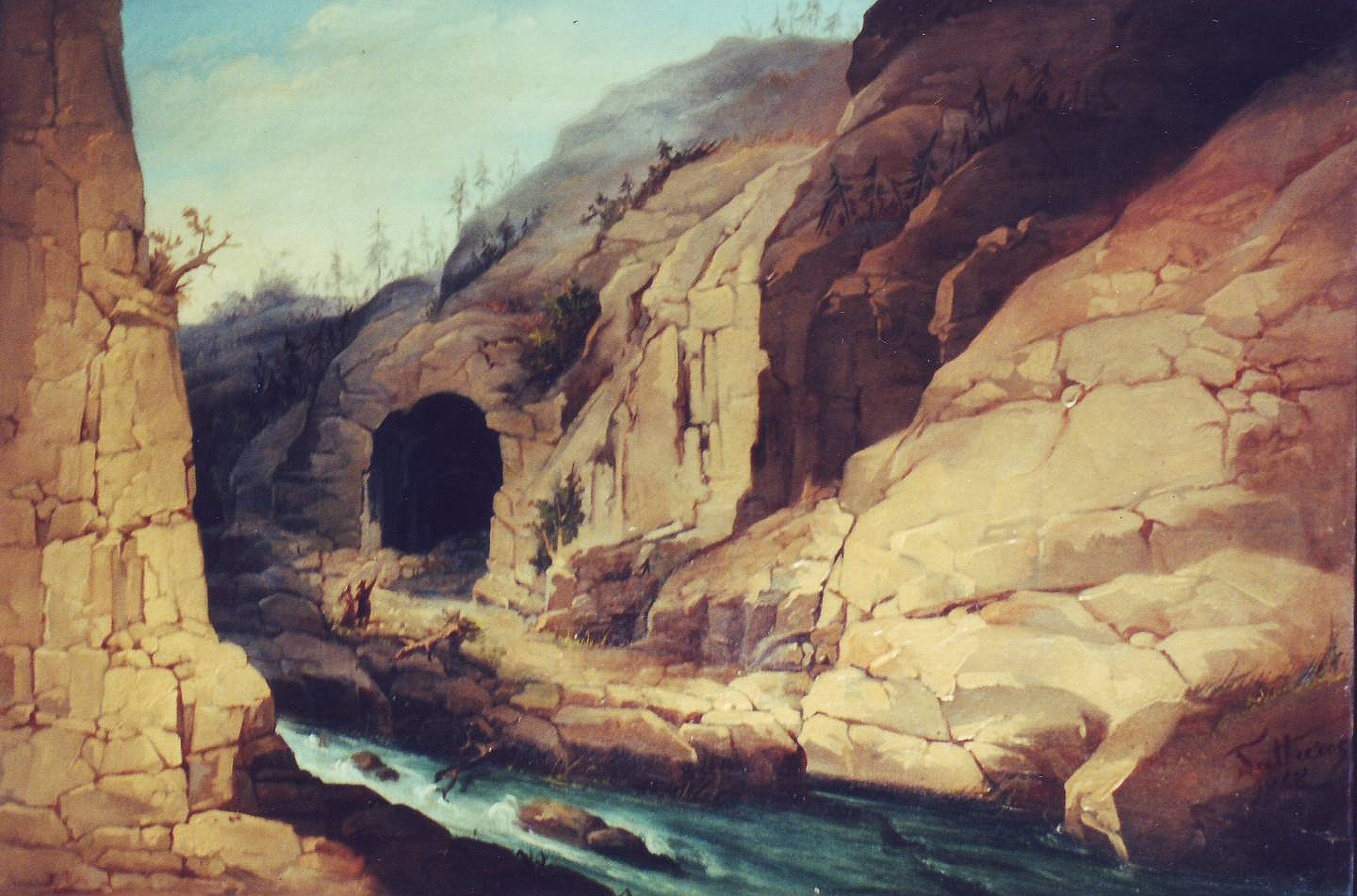
Gheorghe Tattarescu painting of Dâmbovicioara Cave

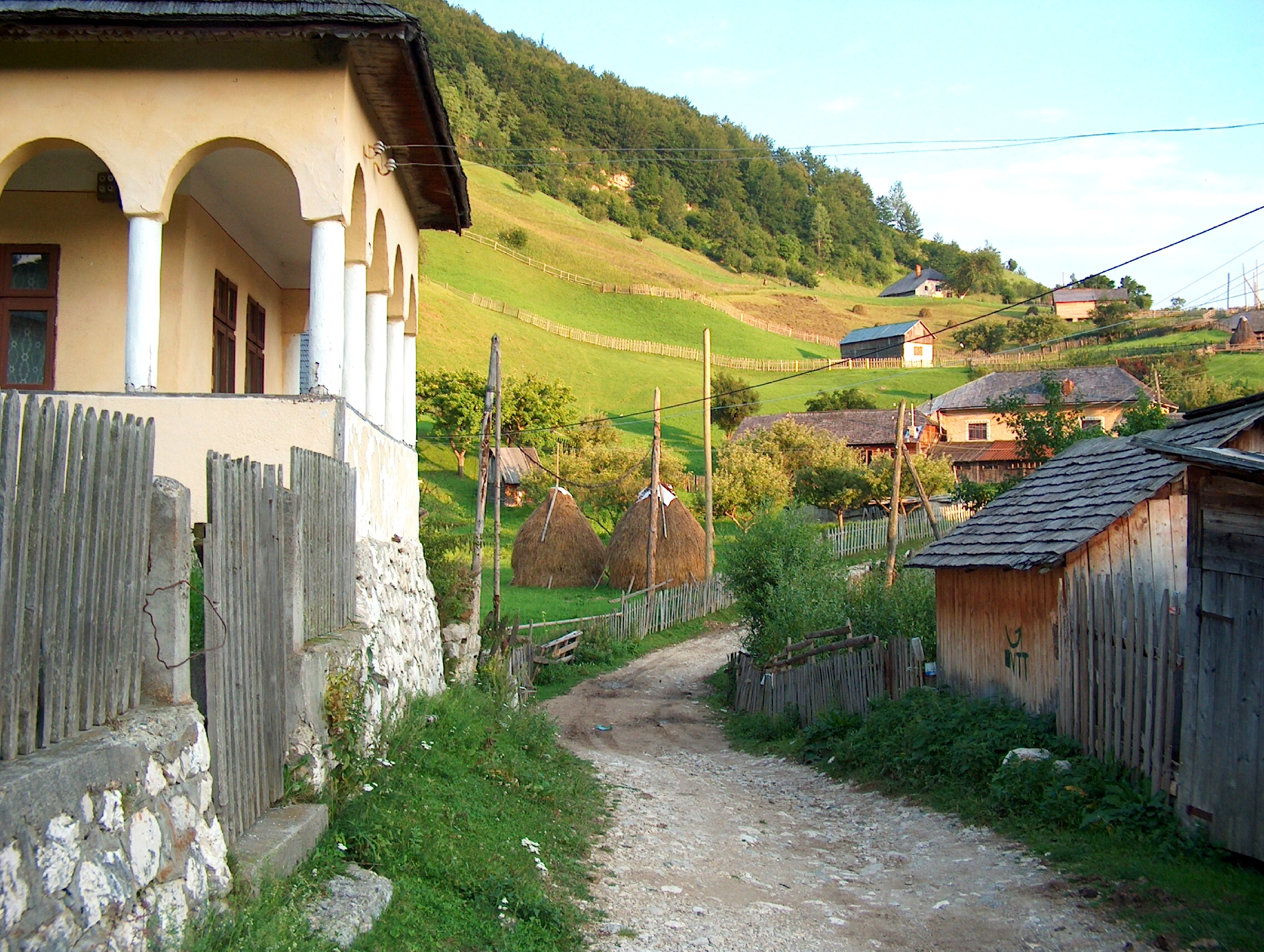
View of Dâmbovicioara
