= Ioan Răuțescu =

Romanian priest and historical researcher

- Born: 1 October 1892; Dragoslavele, Argeș County
- Died: 19 May 1974 (aged 81); Dragoslavele, Argeș County
- Resting place: courtyard of the "Înălțarea Domnului" church in Dragoslavele
- Occupations: Orthodox priest, historian, paleographer
- Partner: Maria (born Arsulescu)
- Children: 9, 6 of whom survived: Nicolae, Ana, Vasilica, Maria Rodica, Sofia and Elena "Puica"
- Writing career
- Genres: monograph, translation, articles
- Notable works: Dragoslavele 1st ed. (1923); Mănăstirea Aninoasa (1933), Dragoslavele 2nd ed. (1937), Topoloveni (1939); Câmpulung-Muscel. Historical monograph (1943)

Ioan (Ion) Răuțescu (1 October 1892 – 19 May 1974) was a Romanian priest, historical monographist, paleographer, collector of old documents, publicist and folklorist who mainly dealt with researching the history of the Muscel area, writing four monographs dedicated to the mentioned area, works awarded by the Romanian Academy, History Section.

== Biography ==
=== Childhood ===
Ioan Răuțescu was born on 1 October 1892, in Dragoslavele commune, former Muscel County, currently Argeș County, being the first of the nine children of Ion and Paraschiva Răuțescu. His father, Ion Răuțescu (24 January 1860 – 14 October 1916) was killed in front of the house by an artillery shell during First World War, Dragoslavele being the theater of the fight. Likewise, the younger brother of the priest Ioan Răuțescu, Daniil Răuțescu (1896–1916), died in 1916 in the battle at the Bratocea pass, his name being found on Mausoleum of Mateiaș, erected in honor of the fallen heroes in the battles of the First World War.

=== Education and training ===
After graduating from the primary school courses in Dragoslavele, carrying in his soul the words of his mother: "I send you to school, to become a teacher or a priest, on the condition that you return to the village", Ioan Răuțescu attends, between 1905 and 1913, the Central Seminary in Bucharest. Here he shows a passion for foreign languages and undertakes the first research investigations of some works and documents at the Romanian Academy Library.

After graduating from the Seminary, on 29 September 1913, he married Maria Arsulescu, the cousin of the playwright Tudor Mușatescu. During their long marriage (61 years) they had 9 children, 6 of whom survived: Nicolae, Ana, Vasilica, Maria Rodica, Sofia and Elena "Puica".

Between 1927 and 1931, Ioan Răuțescu attended, as a scholarship student, the Faculty of Orthodox Theology of the University of Bucharest, showing inclinations for learning Greek, Slavonic, Hebrew, French and German languages. It is being documented at the National Archives of Romania and the Romanian Academy Library to elaborate the bachelor's thesis on the Aninoasa Monastery in Muscel county. He defended his thesis on 31 October 1931, obtaining the maximum grade.

=== Professional activity ===
On 25 January 1914, Ioan Răuțescu was ordained by the bishop Teofil Mihăilescu, the vicar of the Holy Metropolis of Ungrovlahia, as a deacon of the Church "St. Vasile" in Bucharest, and the next day, 26 January 1914, as a priest in the Cathedral of "St. Ioan" from Ploiești, which had the same patron as the "Înălțarea Domnului" church, from the hometown of Dragoslavele. Until 1 October 1920, Ioan Răuțescu was an assistant priest, and after that a parish priest at the same church, raised to the rank of parish by Decree No. 3431 of August 1920. He served this church until his retirement in 1968.

Alongside his pastoral activity, from 1914 to 1920, Ioan Răuțescu taught religion as a substitute teacher at the elementary school in Dragoslavele.

For 25 years, between 1925 and 1950, priest Ioan Răuțescu was uninterruptedly the president of the Rucăr Priests' Circle and, for several years, a member and, later, president of the Court Commission of the Archdiocese in the town of Câmpulung.

For the way he knew how to do his duty as a shepherd, he received the following awards: by the Order of the Holy Metropolis of Ungrovlachia No. 4921 of 31 October 1925 – the right to wear a blue belt and cap, with Order No. 9786/1930 – the right to wear a red belt, and in 1944 the Archdiocese Muscel made it known that the Holy Metropolis granted Ioan Răuțescu the rank of Stavrofor icon priest. The ordination was done by the vicar Veniamin Pocitan, at the beginning of February 1944.

== Death and legacy ==
Ioan Răuțescu died in the family home, in Dragoslavele, on 19 May 1974. He is buried in the courtyard of the "Înălțarea Domnului" church in Dragoslavele.

After 1990, through the care of his youngest daughter, Elena Răuțescu-Petroșanu, some of the works of priest Ioan Răuțescu were republished.

In the center of the city Câmpulung, near the Church Sf. Nicolae, from the end of Negru-Vodă boulevard, opposite the bust of the founder and first ruler of Wallachia – Negru-Vodă, the bust of the priest Ioan Răuțescu was erected in 2004.

By the decision of the City Hall of Câmpulung, Dr. Petru Groza Street became Ioan Răuțescu Street. Also, the Cultural House in Dragoslavele currently bears his name.

== Work ==
- Colinde [Carols] (1919) in Romanian, in the "Dumineca Poporului" Library, no. 1.

=== Historical monographs ===
- Dragoslavele, 1st ed. (1923), in collaboration with the folklorist Constantin Rădulescu-Codin
- Mănăstirea Aninoasa (1933)
- Dragoslavele, 2nd ed. (1937)
- Topoloveni (1939), with a foreword by Ion Mihalache
- Câmpulung-Muscel. Historical monograph (1943)

=== Articles (selective list) ===
- Ioan Răuțescu, Zaharia Petrescu, Schitul Cetățuia Negru Vodă [Hermitage Negru-Vodă Citadel] in Romanian, „Glasul Bisericii" magazine, year XV, 1956, no. 3–4, pp. 152–162
- Ioan Răuțescu, Bisericile din Boteni – Muscel și slujitorii lor [The churches of Boteni – Muscel and their servants], in Romanian, „Glasul Bisericii" magazine, 1964, no. 9–10, pp. 883–896
- Ioan Răuțescu, Catagrafia fostului județ Muscel, făcută la anul 1840 din porunca mitropolitului Neofit [Catagraphy of the former Muscel county, made in 1840 by order of Metropolitan Neofit], in Romanian, „Glasul Bisericii" magazine, 1965, nr. 9–10, pp. 875–900
- Ioan Răuțescu, Bisericile din Rucăr (Muscel) [The churches of Rucăr (Muscel)], in Romanian, „Glasul Bisericii" magazine, 1961, no. 9–10, pp. 818–836
- Ioan Răuțescu, Călătoria mea la mormintele ostașilor germani din România [My trip to the graves of German soldiers in Romania], in Romanian, „Biserica Ortodoxă Română" magazine, 1929, no. 2, pp. 126–129.
- Ioan Răuțescu, Câteva diate vechi [Some old testamentary provisions], in Romanian, „Biserica Ortodoxă Română" magazine, 1928, no. 9, pp. 810–815
- Ioan Răuțescu, Contribuțiuni la cunoașterea preoțimii de mir din trecut [Contributions to the knowledge of the chrism priesthood of the past], in Romanian, „Biserica Ortodoxă Română" magazine, 1924, no. 1, pp. 15–22
- Ioan Răuțescu, Documente privitoare la Mânăstirea Câmpulung și satele Bădeni și Stoenești [Documents regarding the Câmpulung Monastery and the villages of Bădeni and Stoenești], in Romanian, „Biserica Ortodoxă Română" magazine, 1927, no. 10, pp. 604–608
- Ioan Răuțescu, Două acte privitoare la Mitropolitul Filaret I [Two documents regarding the Metropolitan Filaret I], in Romanian, „Biserica Ortodoxă Română" magazine, 1926, no. 2, pp. 69–71
- Ioan Răuțescu, Două acte privitoare la Mitropolitul Grigore al II-lea [Two documents regarding the Metropolitan Grigore II], in Romanian, „Biserica Ortodoxă Română" magazine, 1925, no. 6, pp. 335–336
- Ioan Răuțescu, Egumenul Mânăstirii Câmpulung, Vasile Geabelea [The abbot of the Câmpulung Monastery, Vasile Geabelea], in Romanian, „Biserica Ortodoxă Română" magazine, 1931, no. 10, pp. 602–608
- Ioan Răuțescu, Felurite porunci din timpul păstoriei Mitropolitului Neofit al II-lea al Ungrovlahiei [Various commandments during the pastorate of Metropolitan Neophyte II of Ungrovlachia], in Romanian, „Glasul Bisericii" magazine, 1966, no. 11–12, pp. 1088–1095
- Ioan Răuțescu, Felurite porunci din timpul păstoriei Mitropolitului Neofit al II-lea al Ungrovlahiei. (Note bibliografice) [Various commandments during the pastorate of Metropolitan Neophyte II of Ungrovlachia (Bibliographic notes)], in Romanian, „Studii Teologice" magazine, series II, year XIX, 1967, no. 7–8, p. 544
- Ioan Răuțescu, Formalitățile ce se îndeplineau la hirotonii și cununii la jumătatea secolului al XIX-lea [The formalities that were performed at ordinations and weddings in the mid-19th century], in Romanian, „Glasul Bisericii" magazine, 1962, no. 7–8, pp. 779–784
- Ioan Răuțescu, Însemnări de pe cărțile vechi bisericești [Notes from the old church books], in Romanian, „Biserica Ortodoxă Română" magazine, 1928, no. 3, pp. 236–243
- Ioan Răuțescu, Legăturile Mânăstirii Câmpulung cu vama domnească de la Dragoslavele [The links of the Câmpulung Monastery with the royal customs from Dragoslavele], in Romanian, „Glasul Bisericii" magazine, 1972, no. 3–4, pp. 425–431
- Ioan Răuțescu, O carte de judecată a Mitropolitului Filaret [A judgment book of the Metropolitan Filaret], in Romanian, „Biserica Ortodoxă Română" magazine, 1926, no. 3, pp. 179–181
- Ioan Răuțescu, Preoți din Ardeal refugiați în județul Muscel la 1849 [Priests from Transylvania who took refuge in Muscel county in 1849], in Romanian, „Biserica Ortodoxă Română" magazine, 1936, no. 1–2, pp. 48–152, 182
- Ioan Răuțescu, Sarindarul ["Sarindar" – prayer made by the priest for forty days], in Romanian, „Biserica Ortodoxă Română" magazine, 1927, no. 7, pp. 406–408
- Ioan Răuțescu, Schitul Nămăiești [Nămăiești Hermitage], in Romanian, „Glasul Bisericii" magazine, 1957, no. 8–9, pp. 565–585
- Ioan Răuțescu, Școala Domnească din Câmpulung-Muscel [The Royal School of Campulung-Muscel], in Romanian, „Glasul Bisericii" magazine, 1961, no. 7–8, pp. 696–705
- Ioan Răuțescu, Un manuscris din 1833 privitor la zidirea și înființarea unei biserici lângă orașul Câmpulung-Muscel [A manuscript from 1833 regarding the building and establishment of a church near the town of Câmpulung-Muscel], in Romanian, „Glasul Bisericii" magazine, 1960, no. 9–10, pp. 816–823
- Ioan Răuțescu, Trei protopopi musceleni din sec. al XIX-lea [Three 19th-century archdeacons from Muscel], in Romanian, „Glasul Bisericii" magazine, 1970, no. 9–10, pp. 1012–1027
- Ioan Răuțescu, Știri documentare privitoare la biserica din Schitu Golești (Muscel) [Documentary news about the church in Schitu Golești (Muscel county)], in Romanian, „Glasul Bisericii" magazine, 1962, no. 9–10, pp. 864–877
- Ioan Răuțescu, Un obiceiu vechiu. (Adălmașul) [An old custom: "Adălmaş" – drink (and snack) offered by someone after a transaction is completed.], in Romanian, "Buna Vestire" magazine, year I, no. 10, 30 April 1923

=== Literary contributions ===
- Oaia pierdută – colecția "Ia și citește" [The lost sheep – "Take and Read" Collection] (1927), in Romanian, Biblioteca Cercului de Publicațiuni religioase-morale, "România Mare" Printing House, Bucharest

=== Translations ===
- Ortlepp, Fritz (2003). Luptele din regiunea Bran și Dragoslavele [The battles in the region of Bran and Dragoslavele] (in Romanian). Ed. Phoenix, 2003. p. 168. ISBN 9789738416123. OCLC 895754123.

== Awards ==
- "Grigore Angelescu" Prize (1924), awarded by the Romanian Academy, History section, for the monograph Dragoslavele, 1st ed. (1923)
- "V. Adamachi" Prize (divisible) (1940), awarded by the Romanian Academy, History section, for the monograph Topoloveni (1939)
- "Dr. Cornel Nicoară" Prize (1945), awarded by the Romanian Academy, History section, for the monograph Câmpulung-Muscel (1943)

== Bibliography ==
- Răuțescu-Petroșanu, Elena (2021). Preotul iconom stavrofor Ioan Răuțescu (1892–1974) vrednic slujitor al altarului și al neamului românesc [Ioan Răuțescu (1892–1974), worthy servant of the altar and of the Romanian nation] (in Romanian). Bucharest: Editura Eikon. p. 568. ISBN 978-606-49-0506-2. OCLC 1347173082.
- Păcurariu, Mircea (1996). Dicționarul teologilor români [The dictionary of Romanian theologians] (in Romanian). Bucharest: Editura Univers Enciclopedic. pp. 378–379. ISBN 9789739739146. OCLC 954573645.
- Ștefănescu, Ștefan; & others (1978). Enciclopedia istoriografiei românești [Encyclopedia of Romanian historiography] (in Romanian). Bucharest: Editura Științifică și Enciclopedică. p. 280. OCLC 467557196.
- Datcu, Iordan; Stroescu, S.C. (1979). Dicționarul folcloriștilor Vol.I Folclorul literar românesc [Dictionary of folklorists Vol.I The Romanian literary folklore] (in Romanian). Bucharest: Editura Științifică și Enciclopedică. pp. 369–370. OCLC 165887797.
- Apostol, Ion. "Preotul Ioan Răuțescu din Dragoslavele – la o sută de ani de la nașterea sa" [Priest Ioan Răuțescu from Dragoslavele – one hundred years after his birth] (in Romanian). "Telegraful român" magazine (Sibiu), no. 45–48, 1–15 Dec 1992, pp. 5–6
- Velea, Marin. "Preotul Ioan Răuțescu, istoric și folclorist – 115 ani de la naștere (1892–2007)" [Priest Ioan Răuțescu, historian and folklorist – 115 years since his birth (1892–2007)] (in Romanian). "Argeșul Ortodox" magazine, year VI, no. 327, 23–29 Aug 2007, p. 2
- "Necrolog" [Obituary] (in Romanian). "Glasul Bisericii" magazine, year XXXIII, 1974, no. 5–6, pp. 562–563
- Chița, Gheorghe (2014). Povestea străzilor din Câmpulung-Muscel [The story of the streets of Campulung Muscel] (in Romanian). Bucharest: Editura Ars Docendi. pp. 79–80. ISBN 9789735587680. OCLC 997394331.
- "Dicționarul teologilor români - Ioan Răuțescu" [Dictionary of Romanian Theologists - Ioan Răuțescu]. www.crestinortodox.ro (in Romanian). 13 February 2009.
- "120 de ani de la naşterea preotului cărturar Ioan Răuţescu" [120 years since the birth of the scholar-priest Ioan Răuţescu] (in Romanian). Jurnalul de Argeș. Archived from the original on 1 March 2021.
- "Personalități: istorici, dascăli – Ioan Răuțescu (1892–1974)" [Personalities: historians, teachers – Ioan Răuţescu (1892–1974)]. www.muscelpedia.ro (in Romanian). 1 February 2013. Archived from the original on 5 August 2020.
- "Galeria monografilor musceleni: Preot Ioan Răuţescu" [Gallery of monographers from Muscel: Priest Ioan Răuţescu] (in Romanian). Ziarul din Muscel. 18 October 2015.
- "Arhive personale şi familiale Vol. I – Răuțescu Ion" [Personal and family archives Vol. I – Răuțescu Ion] (PDF) (in Romanian). Arhivele Naționale. p. 198 (#401).
