= Valea Hotarului =

Valea Hotarului may refer to several villages in Romania:

- Valea Hotarului, a village in Dragoslavele Commune, Argeș County
- Valea Hotarului, a district in the city of Sighetu Marmației, Maramureș County
