= Curt von Morgen =

German officer

- Born: 1 November 1858; Neiße, Kingdom of Prussia
- Died: 15 February 1928 (aged 69); Lübeck, Germany
- Relatives: Anthony Fokker
- Military career
- Allegiance: German Empire (to 1918)
- Branch: Prussian Army
- Service years: 1878–1919
- Rank: General of Infantry
- Commands: 15th (2nd Westphalian) Infantry "Prince Frederick of the Netherlands"; 81st Infantry Brigade; 3rd Reserve Division; I Reserve Corps; XIV Reserve Corps
- Conflicts: World War I Battle of Tannenberg; Battle of Łódź (1914); Romanian campaign Hundred Days Offensive
- Awards: Pour le Mérite with Oak Leaves

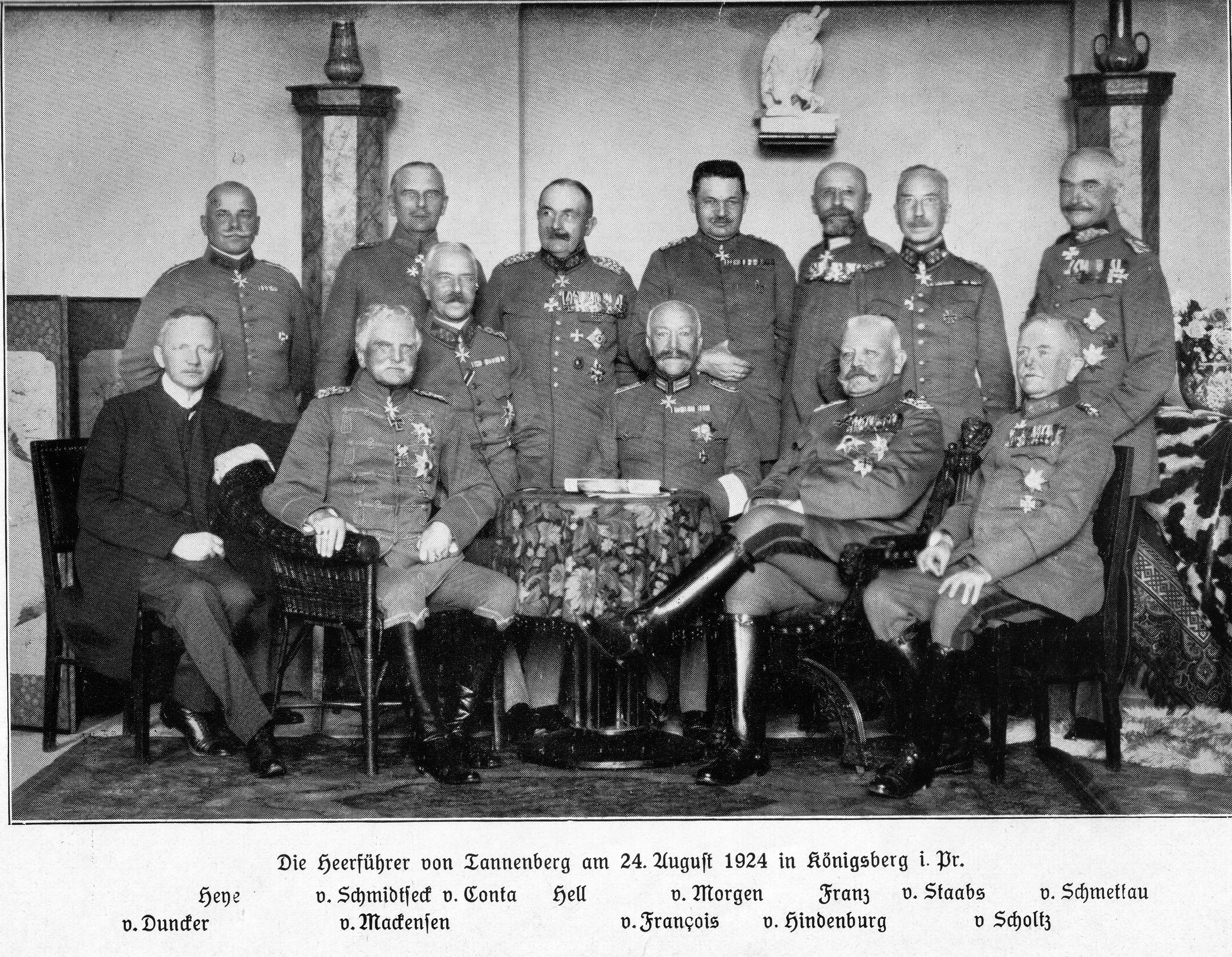
The leaders of Tannenberg on 24 August 1924 in Königsberg (Prussia)

Curt Ernst von Morgen (1 November 1858 in Neiße – 15 February 1928 in Lübeck) was a Prussian explorer and officer, later General of Infantry during World War I. He was a recipient of Pour le Mérite with Oak Leaves.

== Explorer in Cameroon ==
Curt von Morgen was stationed in German Kamerun and undertook two research journeys to central Cameroon in 1889 and from 1890 to 1891. After the expeditions, Morgen returned to Germany but in 1894 he was tasked with the formation of the Kamerun Schutztruppe. He also led two military expeditions against the Abo north of Douala and the Kwe (Bakwiri) near Mount Cameroon.

== The Middle East ==
In 1896-97, he followed as military observer the English Dongola-Expedition against the Mahdists. In 1897, he became Military Attaché in Istanbul. He followed as observer the Greco-Turkish War (1897) and prepared the visit of Kaiser Wilhelm II to Palestine in 1898.

== Military service in Germany ==
On 27 January 1912, he was promoted to Generalmajor and assigned as commander of the 81st Infantry Brigade in Lübeck. On 9 August 1913, when the emperor visited the town, he reported to him.

== World War I ==
On mobilisation for World War I in August 1914, he became commander of the 3rd Reserve Division from Danzig, and promoted to Generalleutnant on the 19th of that month. He commanded this division as part of the 8th Army in the pivotal Battle of Tannenberg at the opening of the war on the Eastern Front, and at the subsequent First Battle of the Masurian Lakes. For his performance in this period, he was awarded the Pour le Mérite on 1 December 1914.

On 24 November 1914, he took over command of I Reserve Corps from Otto von Below. He led this Corps for almost the entire war, only swapping places with Richard Wellman in command of XIV Reserve Corps in August 1918.

With the I Reserve Corps, he fought in the Battle of Łódź (1914) and in the Romanian campaign (1916-1917) in which he failed to achieve a decisive breakthrough after being defeated by the Romanians at Dragoslavele, 8 miles from the town of Câmpulung. Von Morgen argued that much more of the Romanian Army could have been captured if a breakthrough would have been achieved at Câmpulung. He insisted that this would have achieved "a real victory, a Cannae, a Tannenberg".

He was awarded the Oakleaves to the Pour le Mérite (signifying a second award) on 11 December 1916.

== Later life ==
After his retirement he became General of Infanterie and returned to Lübeck.

== Family ==
His son Heinrich-Joachim von Morgen (1902–1932) was an early German race car driver. His daughter Elizabeth married in 1919 till 1923 the aircraft designer Anthony Fokker (1890-1939).

== Awards ==
- Iron Cross of 1914, 1st and 2nd class
- Pour le Mérite (1 December 1914) and Oak Leaves (11 December 1916)
- Order of the Crown, 2nd class with Swords on rings
- Knight's Cross, First Class of the Order of the Zähringer Lion with oak leaves (Baden)
- Order of the Red Eagle, 2nd class with Oak Leaves and Swords on rings
- Knight's Cross Second Class Order of the White Falcon
- Commander of the Order of Orange-Nassau (Netherlands)
- Commander of the Order of St. Michael (Bavaria)
- Knight's Cross, First Class of the Ducal Saxe-Ernestine House Order (Saxon duchies)
- Service Award (Prussia)
- Grand Commander of the Order of the Griffon (Mecklenburg)
- Cross of Merit, First Class of the Lippe House Order with Swords
- Commander Second Class of the Order of the Crown (Württemberg)
- Knight's Cross, First Class of the Friedrich Order (Württemberg)
- Grand Officer of the Order of Military Merit (Bulgaria)
- Order of the Double Dragon, 3rd Degree, First Class
- Commander of the Order of the Crown (Romania)
- Officer of the Order of the White Eagle (Serbia)
- Gold Imtiaz Medal (Ottoman Empire)
- Order of Osmanieh, 2nd class (Ottoman Empire)
- Order of the Medjidie, 2nd class (Ottoman Empire)
- Hanseatic Cross of Lübeck (2 November 1915) [9]
- Gold Liakat Medal (Ottoman Empire)

Military offices
Preceded by General der Infanterie Otto von Below	Commander, I Reserve Corps; 28 November 1914 - 25 August 1918	Succeeded by Generalleutnant Richard Wellman
Preceded by Generalleutnant Richard Wellman	Commander, XIV Reserve Corps; 25 August 1918 - 11 November 1918	Succeeded by Disbanded
