= Valea Mare-Pravăț =

- Commune
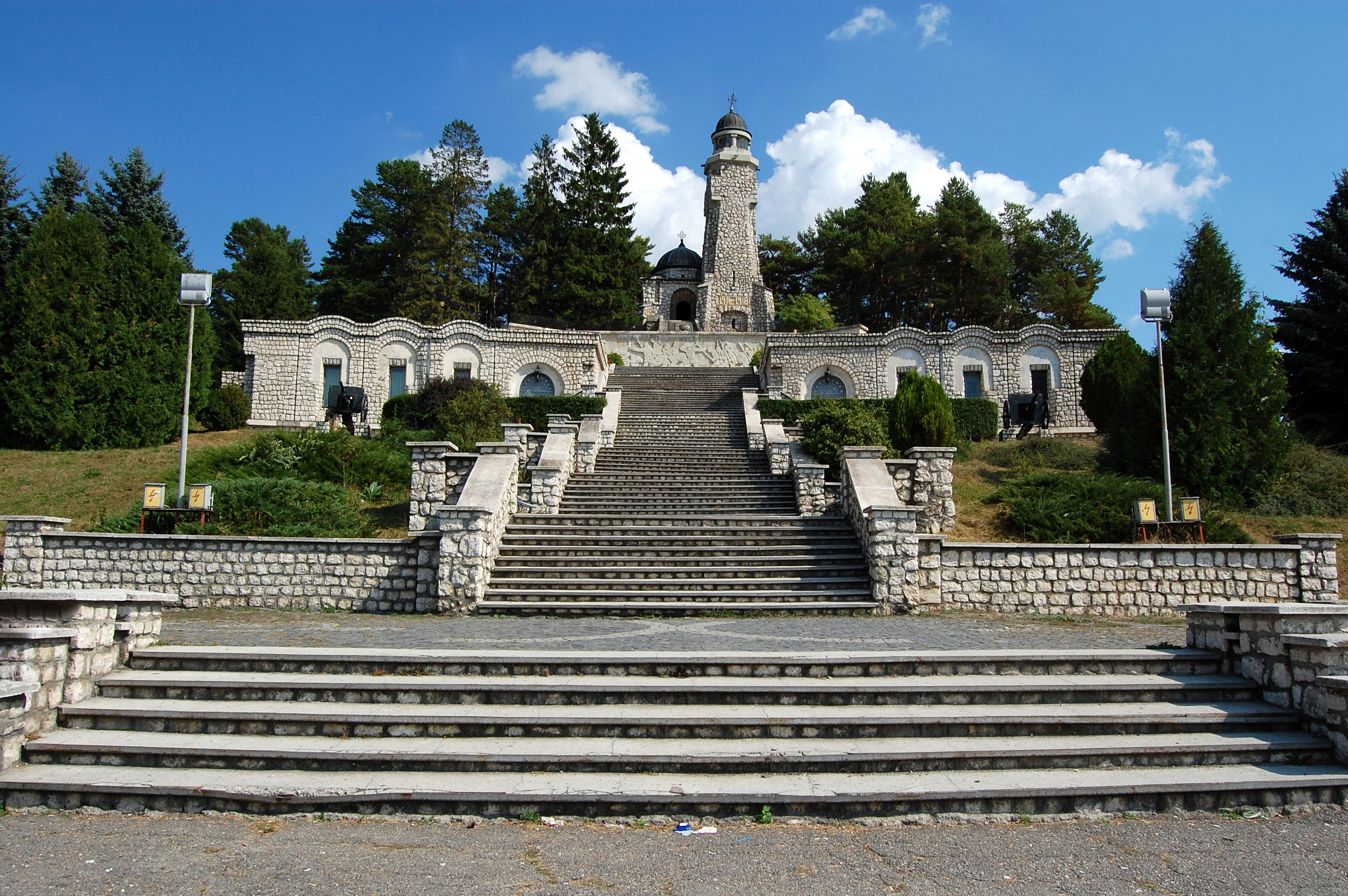
- Mateiaș Mausoleum

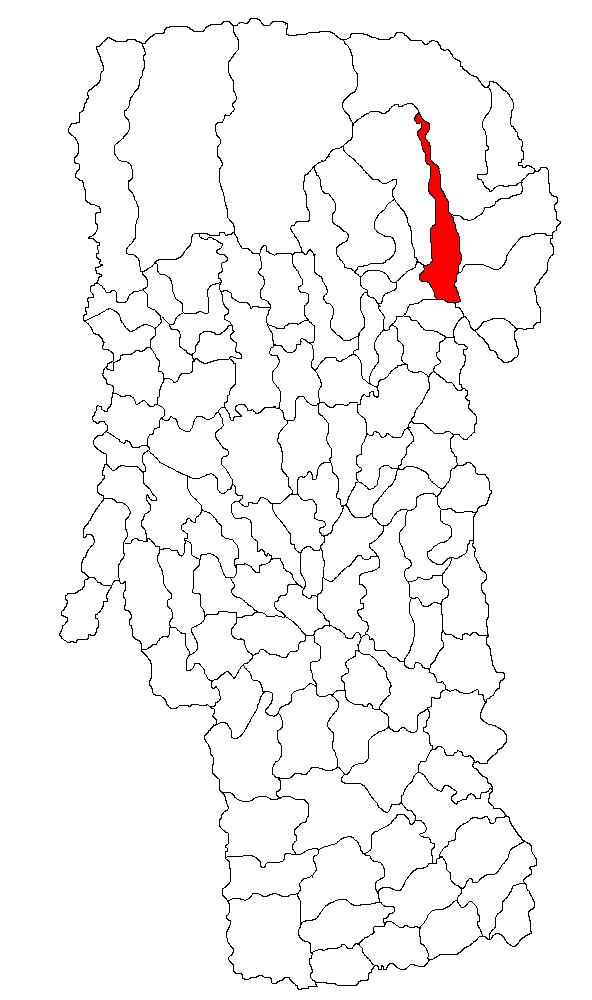
- Location in Argeș County

- Location in Romania
- Coordinates: 45°17′N 25°5′E
- Country: Romania
- County: Argeș

Government
  - Mayor (2020–2024): Petre-Ionel Boncoi (PSD)
- Area: 60.4 km^{2} (23.3 sq mi)
- Highest elevation: 2,391 m (7,844 ft)
- Population (2021-12-01): 4,011
  - Density: 66.4/km^{2} (172/sq mi)
- Time zone: UTC+02:00 (EET)
  - Summer (DST): UTC+03:00 (EEST)
- Postal code: 117805
- Vehicle reg.: AG
- Website: www.valeamarepravat.ro

Valea Mare-Pravăț is a commune in Argeș County, Muntenia, Romania. It is composed of eight villages: Bilcești, Colnic, Fântânea, Gura Pravăț, Nămăești, Pietroasa, Șelari, and Valea Mare-Pravăț.

The commune is located in the northeastern part of the county, right next to the city of Câmpulung, and 58 km (36 mi) from the county seat, Pitești. It lies on the banks of the river Argeșel, at the foot of the Iezer Mountains. The highest point in the commune is Păpușa Peak, at 2,391 m (7,844 ft).

Valea Mare-Pravăț borders Rucăr commune to the northeast, Dragoslavele and Stoenești communes to the east, Mioarele commune to the south, and Câmpulung municipality and Lerești commune to the west.

The commune is crossed by the national road DN73 that connects Câmpulung and Brașov across the Rucăr-Bran Pass. Near Valea Mare-Pravăț, county road DN72A branches off DN73 and leads to the southwest to the city of Târgoviște on the Dâmbovița River valley.

The Mausoleum of the Heroes, also known as the Mateiaș Mausoleum, is a monument dedicated to the soldiers who fought in World War I, during the Romanian Campaign of 1916–1918. It is located on European route E574 (DN73), 11 km (6.8 mi) from Câmpulung on the road to Brașov, on Mateiaș Hill.

Nămăești hosts the George Topîrceanu Memorial House as well as Nămăești Monastery.
