= Mausoleum of Mateiaș =

Monument in Romania

Coordinates: 45°17′32″N 25°08′22″E

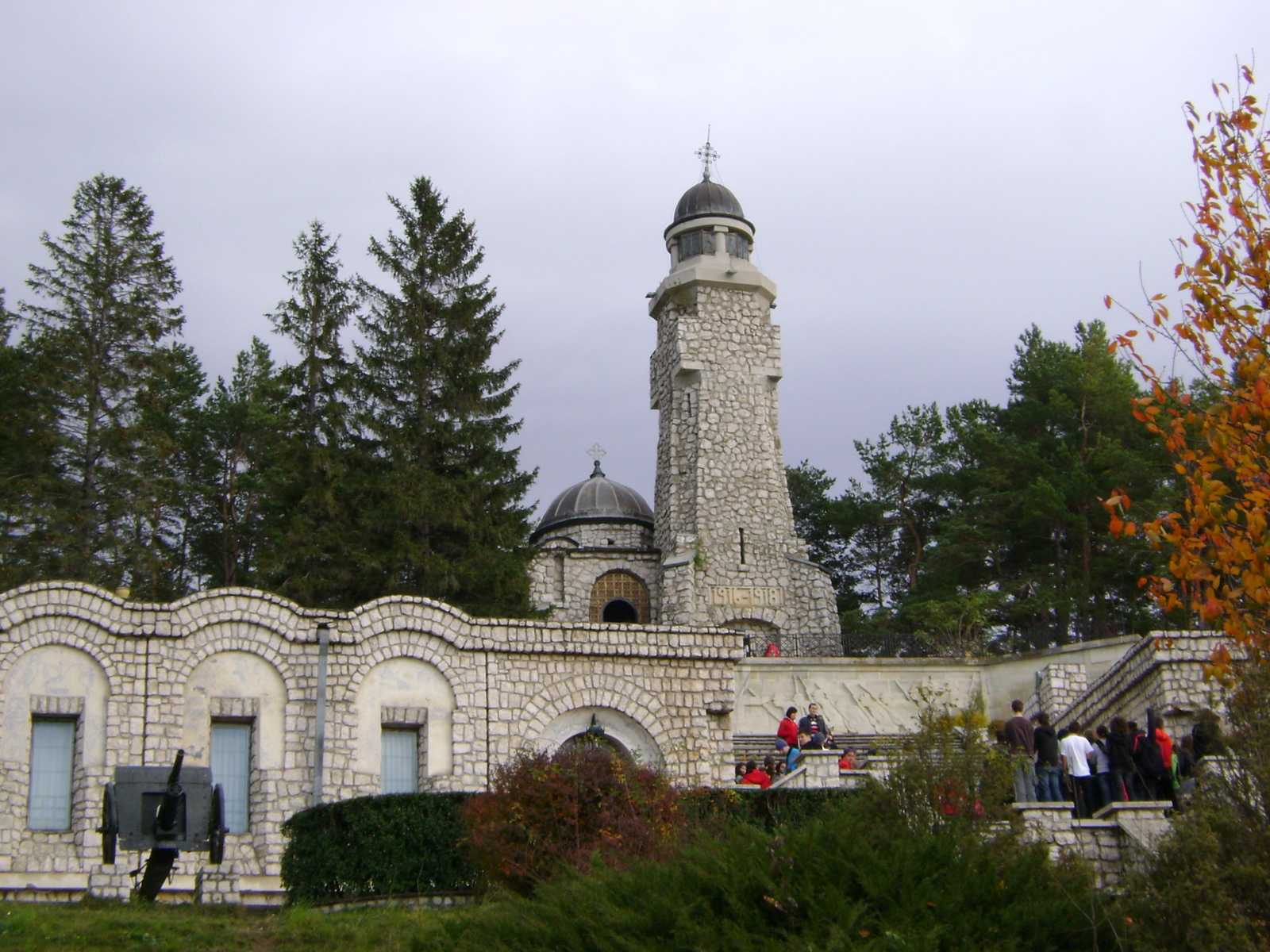
Mausoleum of Mateiaș

Heroes' Mausoleum, in the commune of Valea Mare-Pravăț, Argeș County, Romania, also known as the Mausoleum of Mateiaș, is a historic monument dedicated to the heroes of the war of 1916–1918, considered by Romanians as the War for National Integration. It is located on the European Route E574 (DN 73), 11 km from Câmpulung towards Brașov, on Mateiaș Hill.

The monument is listed at position no. 1010, with the code AG-IV-m-A-14017, in the "List of historical monuments", updated by the Order of the Minister of Culture and Religion no. 2314/July 8, 2004.

== History ==
Here in the Mateiaș area, Nămăiesti Group, led by General Traian Găiseanu and comprising the 22nd and 12th Infantry Divisions, succeeded in resisting a clearly better-equipped and much better prepared enemy, during the period 8 October to 23 November 1916 (New Style). Through the fighting here, the advance of the Central Powers towards the Wallachian Plain was stopped, but due to the breakthrough of the front on Jiu, the soldiers of the 2 divisions were ordered to withdraw - undefeated - on November 16/29, 1916, towards Târgoviște.

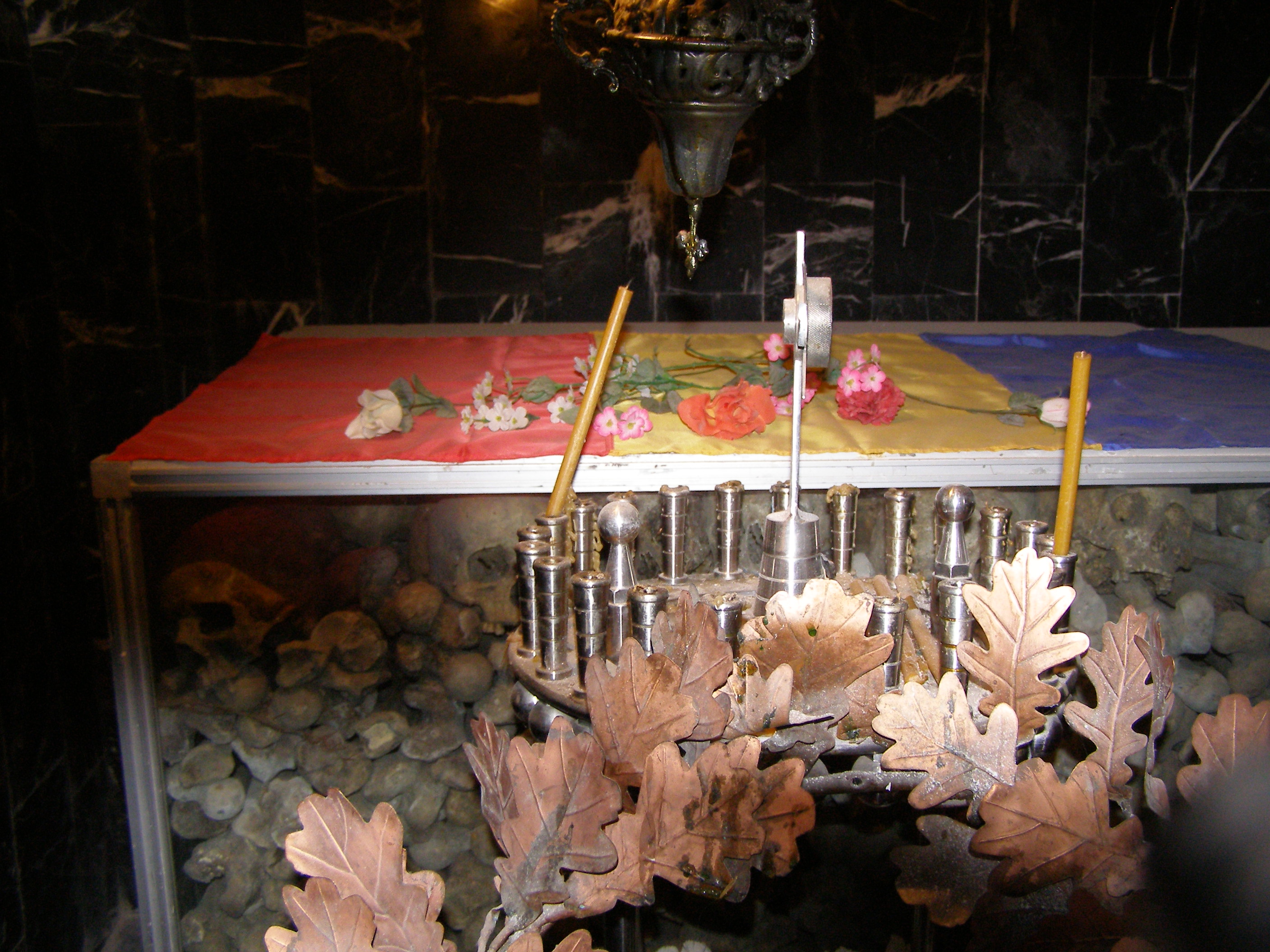
Osuarry in the Mausoleum of Mateiaș

The mausoleum was built between 1928 and 1935, according to the plans of the architects Dumitru Ionescu-Berechet and State Baloșin, by the builder De Nicolo. Limestone from Albești was mainly used in the construction.

The building is composed of two parts: a horizontal one (the ossuary) which houses the bones of over 2,300 Romanian soldiers in 31 crypts, and a vertical one, in the shape of a tower with a spiral staircase leading to a pavilion. Due to the infiltration of water through the limestone walls, between 1945 and 1976 the Monument to the Heroes of Mateiaș was subjected to repair works. The earthquake of March 4, 1977 caused numerous cracks, so in 1978 consolidation work was undertaken.

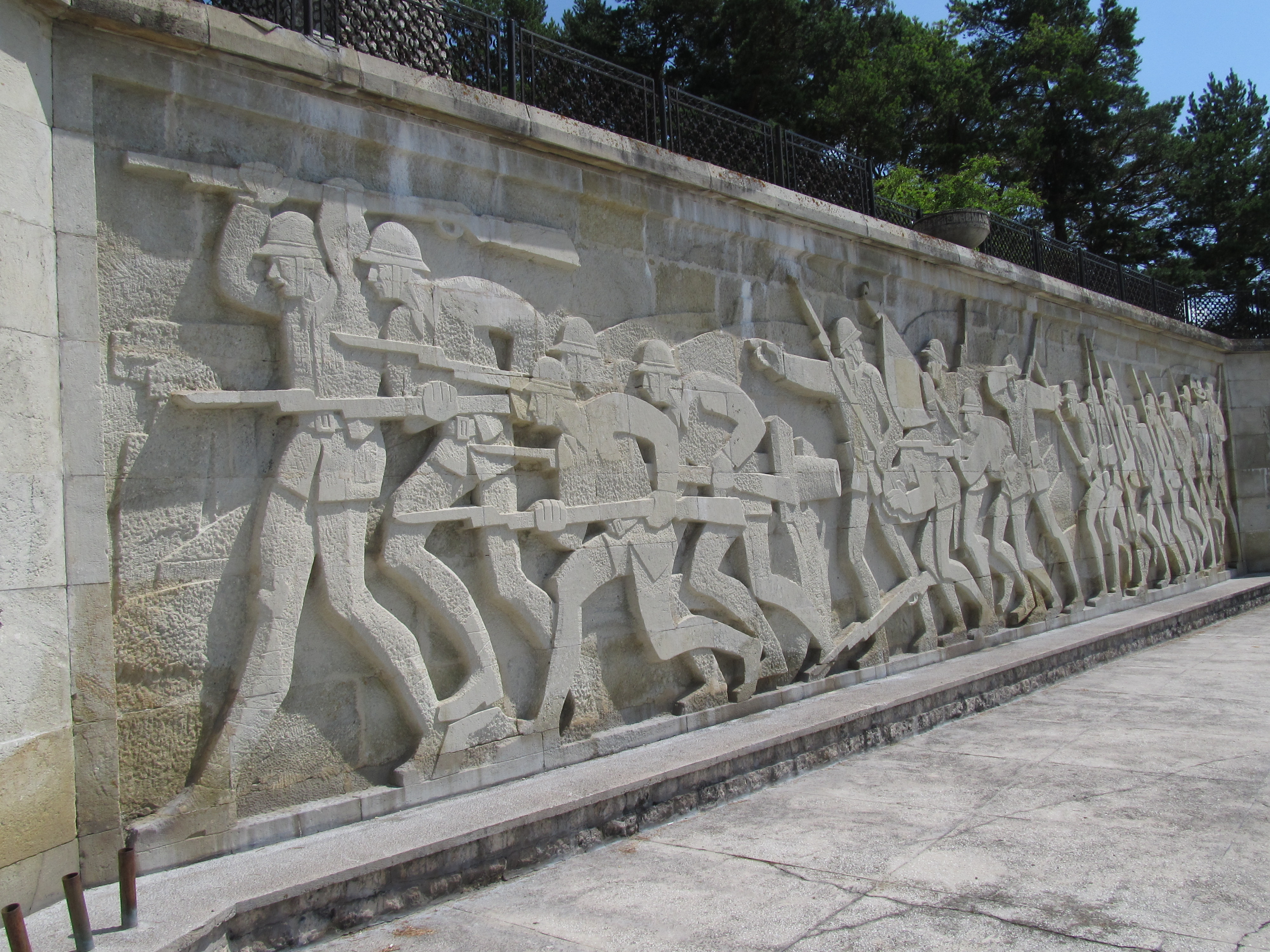
Bas-relief of the Heroes' Mausoleum of Mateiaș

In the period 1980–1984, the Heroes' Mausoleum was expanded by building a parade terrace, imposing access stairs, museum rooms, a 16 m long and 3.5 m high bas-relief made by the sculptor Adrian Radu from Câmpulung. A cup made of Albești stone was also built, in which an eternal flame burns in memory of the fallen heroes in Mateiaș.
