= Rucăr =

- Commune
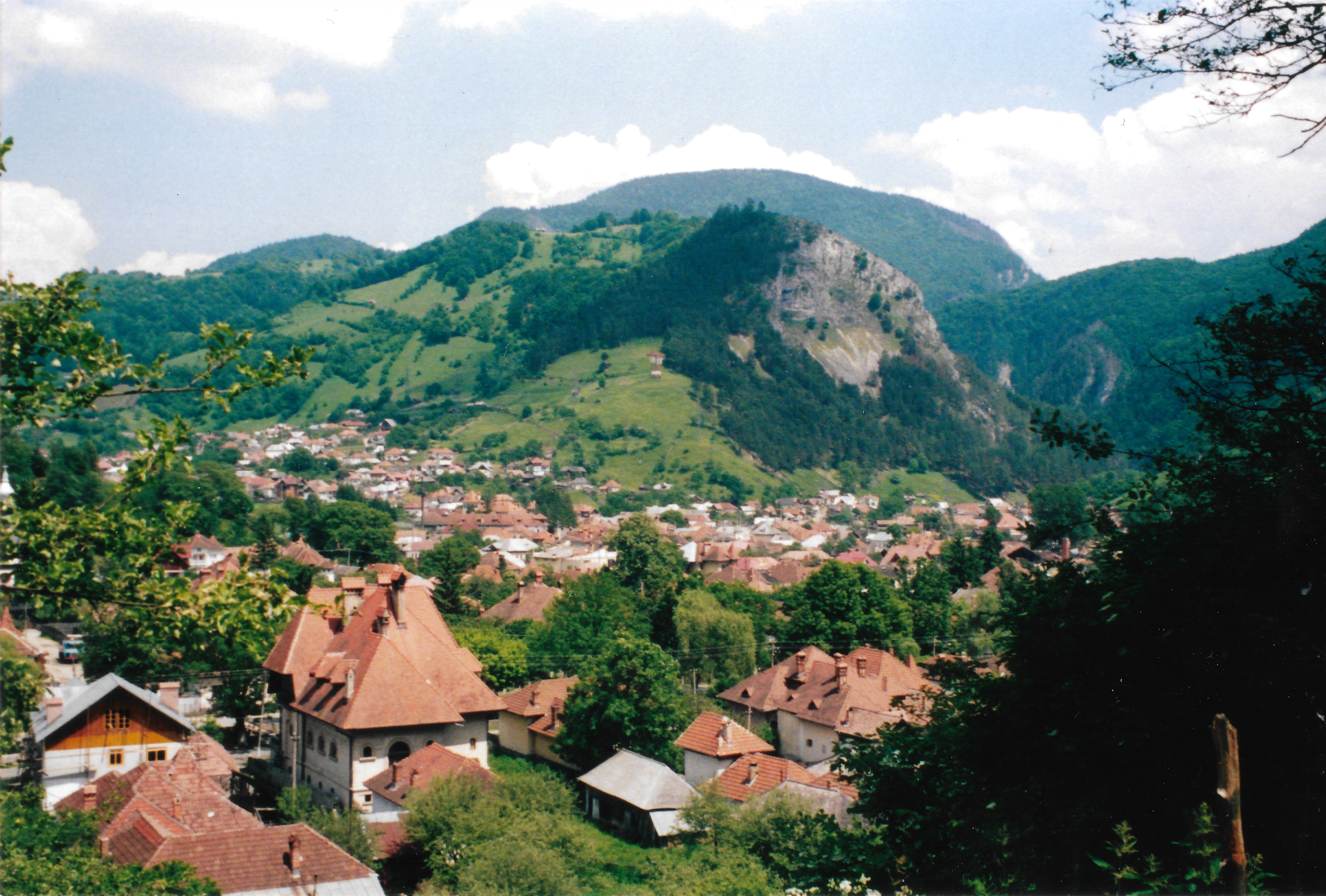

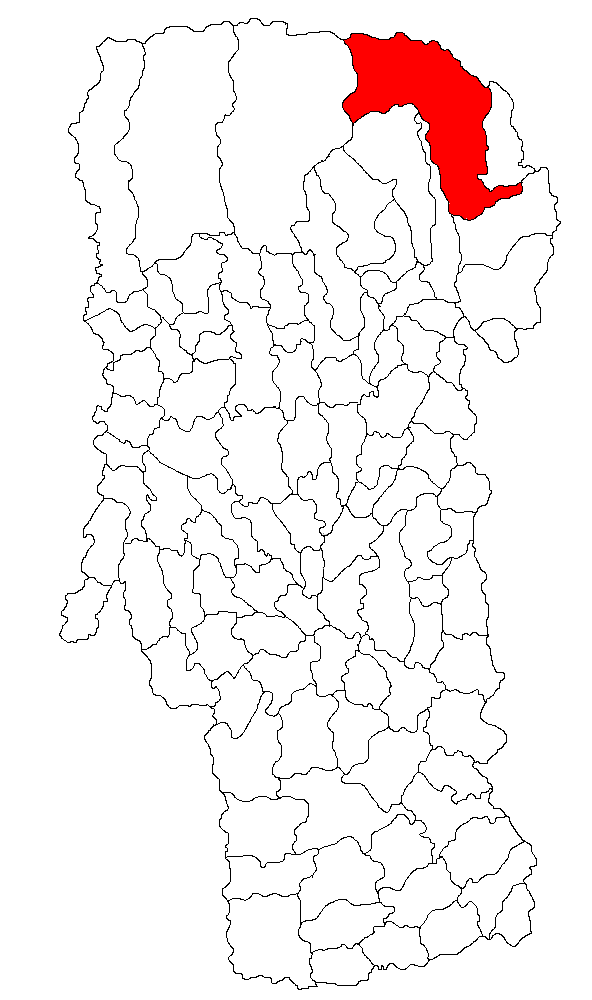
- Location in Argeș County

- Location in Romania
- Coordinates: 45°23′15″N 25°10′15″E
- Country: Romania
- County: Argeș

Government
  - Mayor (2020–2024): Ionel Dulamă (PSD)
- Area: 284.11 km^{2} (109.70 sq mi)
- Elevation: 687 m (2,254 ft)
- Population (2021-12-01): 5,259
  - Density: 18.51/km^{2} (47.94/sq mi)
- Time zone: UTC+02:00 (EET)
  - Summer (DST): UTC+03:00 (EEST)
- Postal code: 117630
- Vehicle reg.: AG
- Website: www.primariarucar.ro

Rucăr is a commune located in the north-eastern part of Argeș County, Romania, situated in the Carpathian Mountains. The commune is composed of two villages, Rucăr and Sătic, and its population as of 2021 was 5,259. Historically important for its role as a border region between Wallachia and its neighboring countries, it is today popular with tourists from Bran Castle.

== Etymology ==
In the earliest documents in which it is mentioned, Rucăr is referred to as Ruffa Arbor or Rot Bom, both meaning "red tree" in Latin and German, respectively. Early Slavic and Romanian documents use the names Rukel, Rukal, or Rucal, translated as the same. Historian Gheorghe Pârunță suggests that the area was named "after the copper leaves of the extensive beech forests that existed at that time."

== History ==
Human settlement in the area of Rucăr stretches at least as far back as the administration of Roman Dacia, given the presence of Roman forts in the region, such as the nearby Jidava Castra. These existed as points along the Roman Empire's limes in the Danube region. Ceramic remains found in Rucăr suggest settlement in the region even before the arrival of Roman administration.

The earliest documented mention of Rucăr is in the decree issued by Louis I of Hungary on November 19, 1377, that authorized the construction of Bran Castle. The decree directs that Rucăr would be established as a location for the collection of tributes should the territory of Wallachia come under Hungarian control.

Situated close to the border between Wallachia and Transylvania, Rucăr remained an important locale through which trade, foreign travelers, and diplomats flowed. The schools established to train customs officers in Rucăr later helped to facilitate the adoption of the Romanian language in place of Old Church Slavonic during the 16th century.

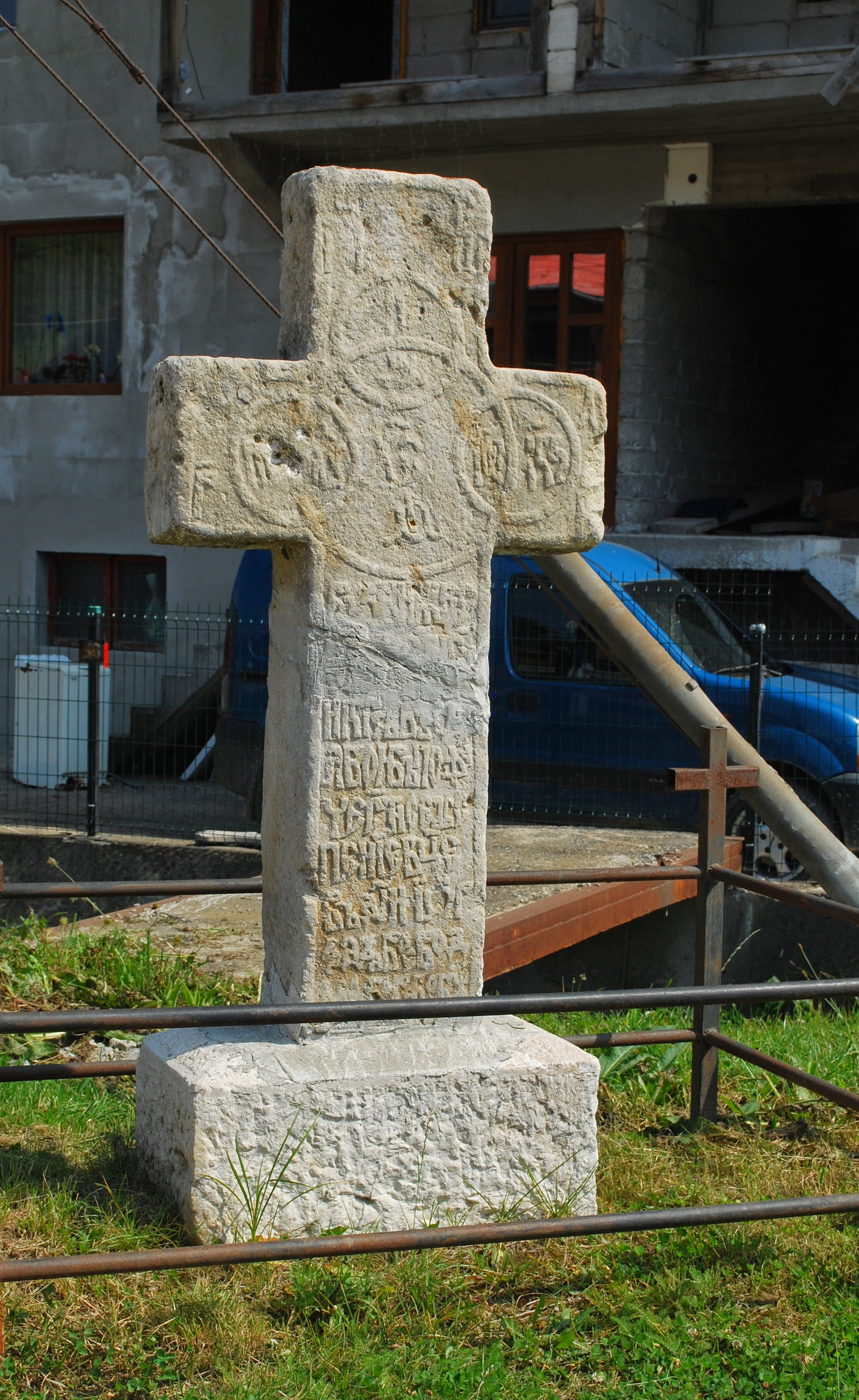
Stone cross of "la Roghina" in Rucăr (1614)

Rucăr saw several armies and voivodes pass through the region to engage with Wallachia's neighboring polities during its history. The area itself also sometimes became a ground for mountain battles during the Middle Ages, as Wallachian voivodes fought against the Kingdom of Hungary, the Second Bulgarian Empire, and the Ottoman Empire. According to some documents, Vlad the Impaler took up residence in Rucăr from 1459 to 1460.

In the Wallachian Revolution of 1848, the provisional government escaped to Rucăr in order to organize its resistance against Ottoman and Russian intervention. Later, in the Battle of Dragoslavele during World War I, German forces passed through the town of Rucăr, destroying some 150 homes.

== Geography ==
The commune is located at the intersection of five relief units: the Iezer Mountains, the Făgăraș Mountains, the Piatra Craiului Mountains, the Leaota Mountains, and the Bran–Rucăr Pass. Its hydrology is dominated by the Dâmbovița River and its tributaries, which flow through the depressions created by the commune's varied terrain. Rucar is located near the border of Brașov County, and national road DN73 – which links Brașov and Pitești – passes through Rucăr.

By the end of the 19th century, the commune was part of the Dâmbovița Plain of the historical Muscel County, which it shared with the village of Dâmbovicioara. In 1931, Dâmbovicioara split from Rucăr to form its current commune, and in 1951 Rucăr became part of the Argeș Region. In 1968, it joined the territory of the modern Argeș County, and with the transfer of the village of Podul Dâmboviței to Dâmbovicioara acquired its current administration.

== Notable people ==
- Dan Nistor (born 1988), football player
- Victor Slăvescu (1891–1977), economist and politician
