= Rucăr–Bran Pass =

Mountain pass in Romania

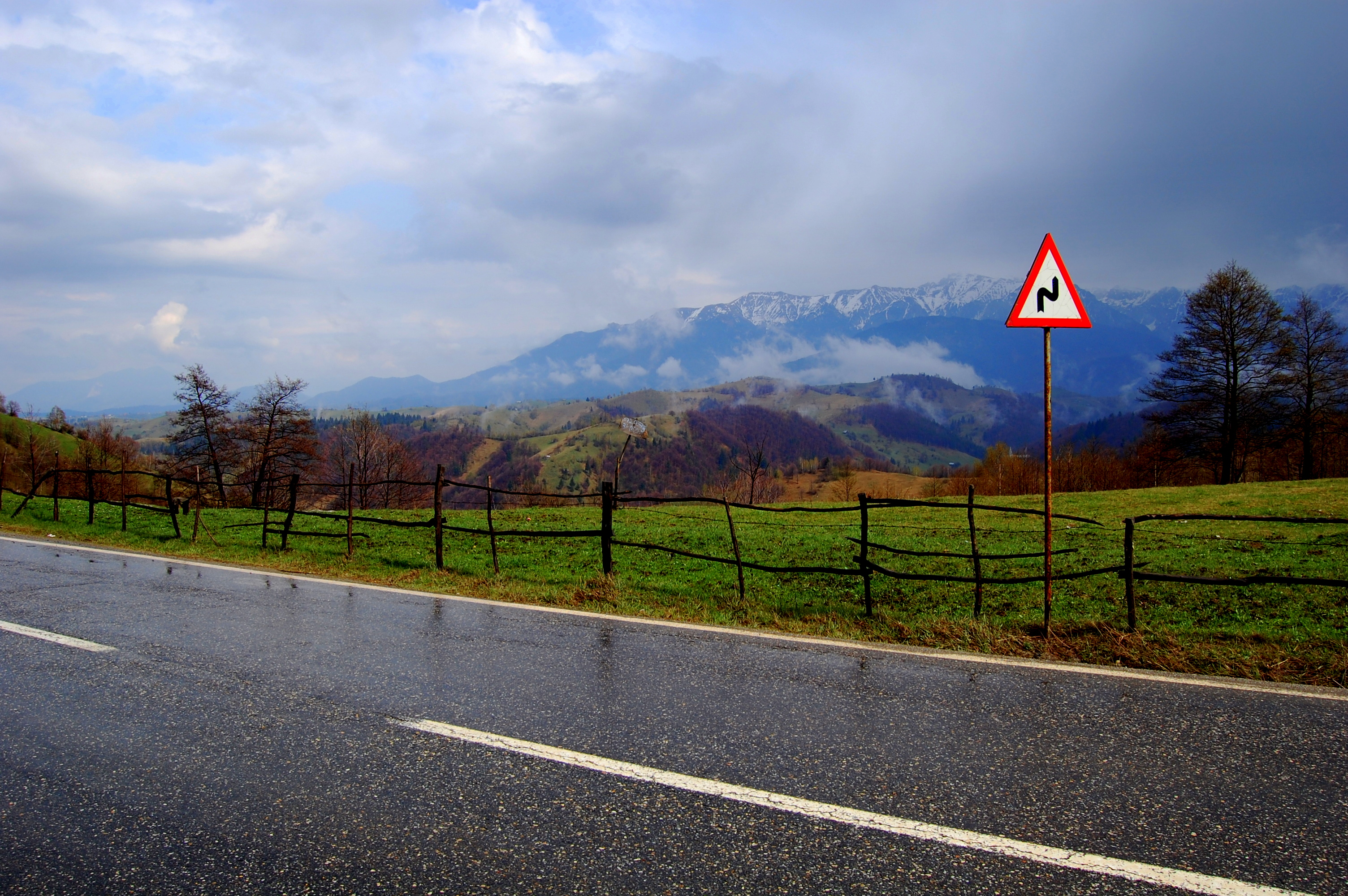
- The Bucegi Mountains as seen from the village of Moieciu in the Rucăr–Bran Pass

- Location within Romania
- Elevation: 1,300 metres (4,300 ft)
- Length: 34 kilometres (21 mi)
- Traversed by: DN73

Third Approach
- Location: Romania
- Range: Southern Carpathians
- Coordinates: 45.439237°N 25.264880°E

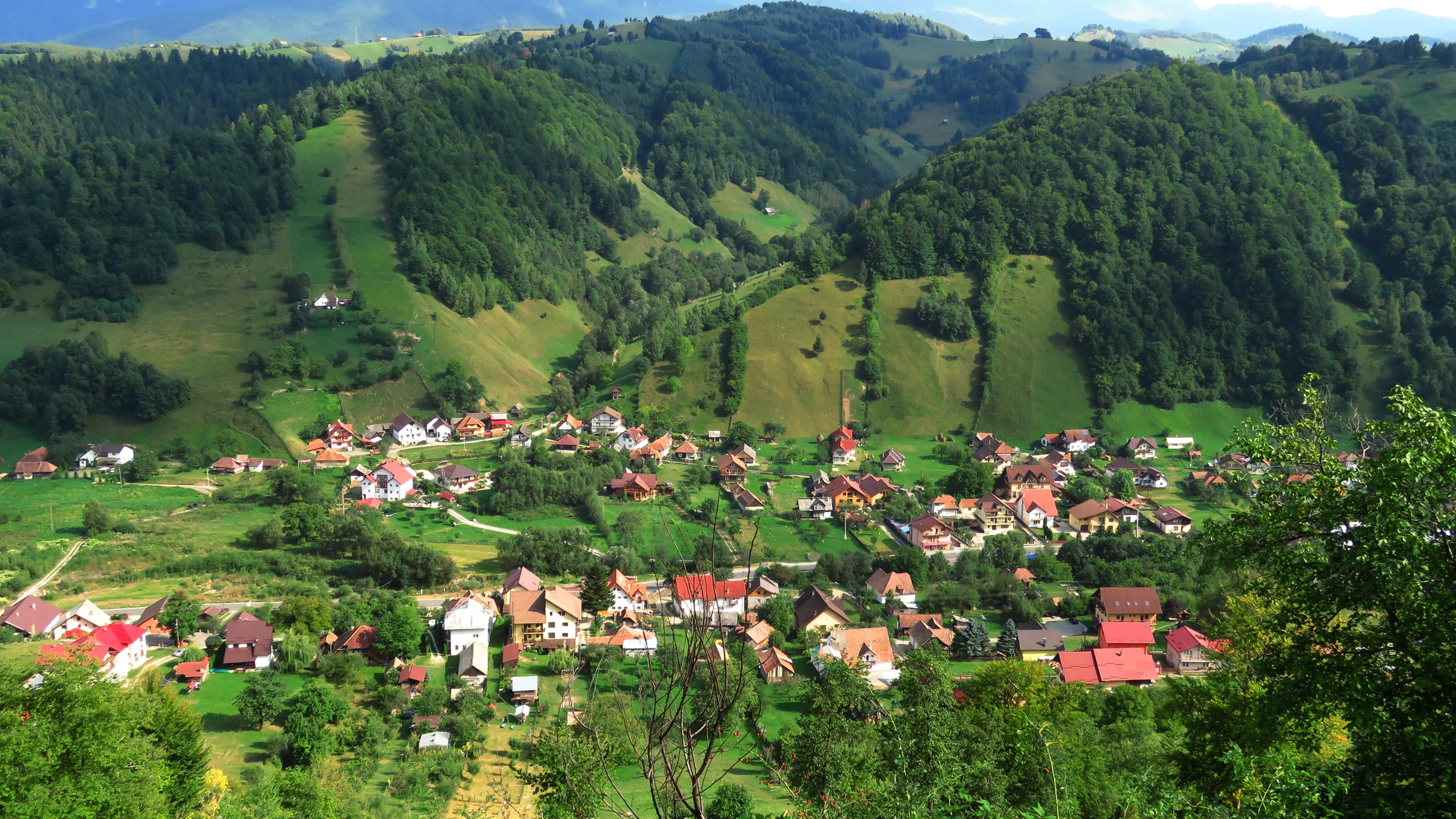
The Rucăr-Bran Pass

The Rucăr–Bran Pass, also called in English the Bran Pass (German: Törzburger Pass, Hungarian: Törcsvári-szoros), is a mountain pass in Romania, linking the counties of Brașov and Argeș. It has some of the most spectacular natural views in Romania, looking over the Bucegi Mountains of the Southern Carpathians.

The Pass starts in the commune of Rucăr, Argeș County, and runs for about 34 kilometres (21 miles) in a northeasterly direction. The communes of Fundata (including Șirnea village) and Moieciu, both in Brașov County, lie within the Pass, which ends in Bran. National road DN73 runs through the Pass, connecting the city of Pitești, 76 km (47 mi) southwest of Rucăr, to the city of Brașov, 29 km (18 mi) northeast of Bran. The Pass reaches a maximum elevation of 1,300 m (4,300 ft) in Fundata.

== History ==
In 1382, Bran Castle was built by the Transylvanian Saxons of Brașov to defend the Pass from the Ottomans.

In the year 1413, a customs post in the Pass was licensed by the ruler of Wallachia. This charged a duty on all goods brought through the Pass. Southwards the usual trade route ran to Cetățeni, branching out to Popești and Hârșova.
