= DN73 =

Road in Romania

National Road 73
- Drumul Național 73
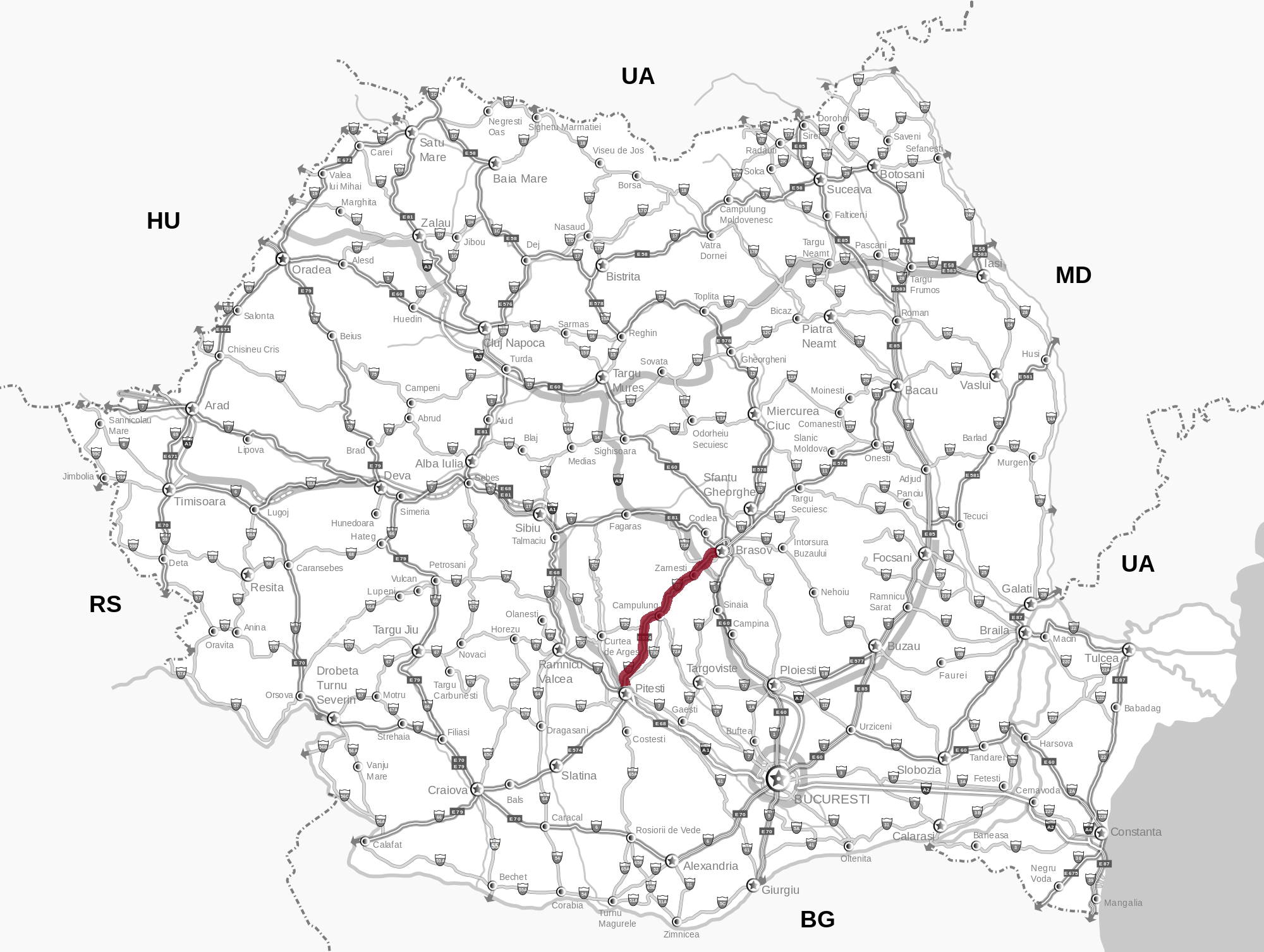

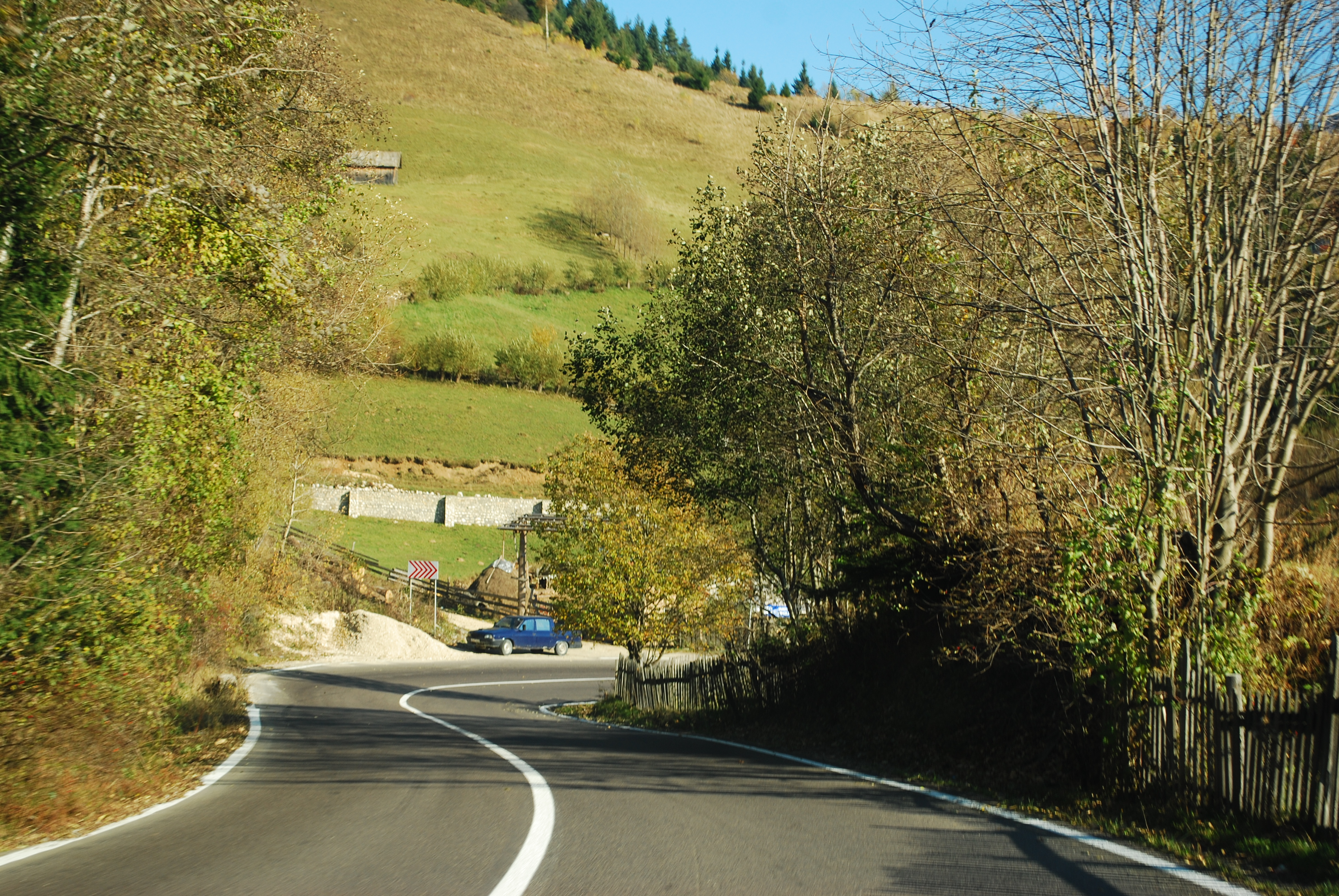
- DN73 in Argeș County, between Rucăr and Bran

Route information
- Part of E574
- Maintained by Compania Națională de Administrare a Infrastructurii Rutiere
- Length: 133 km (83 mi)

Major junctions
- South end: Pitești
- DN7 at Pitești; DN73C at Schitu Golești; DN72A at Valea Mare-Pravăț; DN73A at Râșnov; DN1 at Brașov
- North end: Brașov

Location
- Country: Romania
- Counties: Argeș, Brașov
- Major cities: Pitești, Câmpulung, Râșnov, Brașov

Highway system
- Roads in Romania; Highways

DN73 (Romanian: Drumul Național 73) is a national road in Romania which links Pitești with Brașov. It is a high-traffic road and the preferred route for trucks. Near Câmpulung the road crosses the Southern Carpathians along the Dâmbovița River. The road crosses several tourist-stop villages, such as Rucăr, Dâmbovicioara, and Bran.
