= Cotmeana (river) =

- Location within Romania

Location
- Country: Romania
- Counties: Argeș County

Physical characteristics
- Mouth: Vedea
  - location: Bădești
  - coordinates: 44.3933°N 24.7554°E
- Length: 93 km (58 mi)
- Basin size: 418 km^{2} (161 sq mi)

Basin features
- Progression: Vedea→ Danube→ Black Sea
- Tributaries
  - left: Vârtej, Bumbuieni, Ursoaia
  - right: Cotmenița, Mârghia

The Cotmeana is a left tributary of the river Vedea in Romania. It discharges into the Vedea in Bădești. The following towns and villages are situated along the river Cotmeana, from source to mouth: Cotmeana, Bărbătești, Cocu, Păduroiu din Vale, Găinușa, Lipia, Drăghicești, Popești, Turcești, Bănărești, Lunca Corbului, Pădureți, Catane, Ciești, Fâlfani, Cotmeana, Izbășești, Cochinești, Stolnici, Vlășcuța, Hârsești, Ciobani, Martalogi, Urlueni, Malu, Ciocești, Șelăreasca, Bârla and Bădești. Its length is 93 km (58 mi) and its basin size is 418 km^{2} (161 sq mi).
