= Cârcinov =

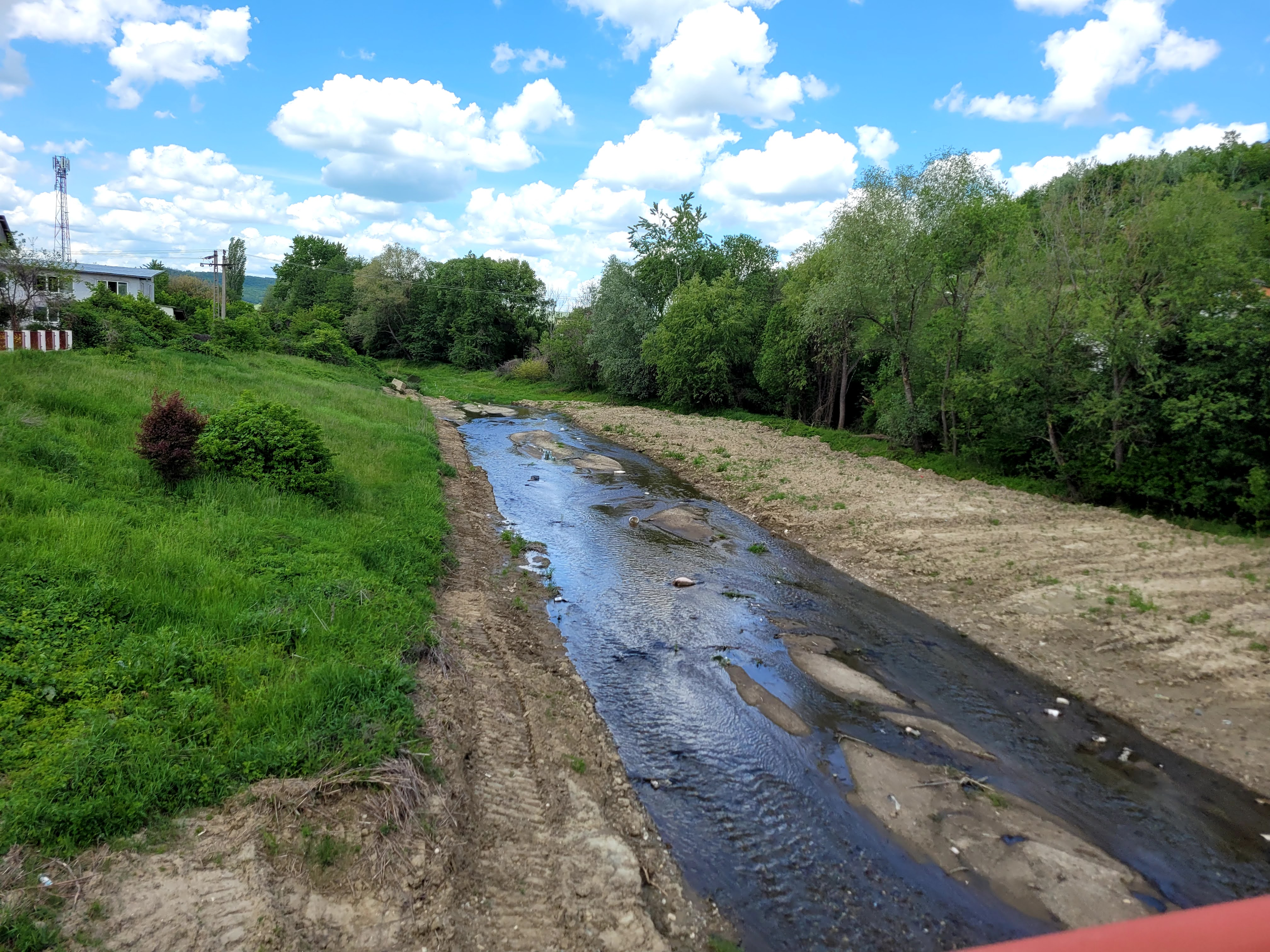

- Location within Romania

Location
- Country: Romania
- Counties: Argeș County
- Towns: Topoloveni

Physical characteristics
- Mouth: Argeș
  - location: Topoloveni
  - coordinates: 44.7801°N 25.0721°E
- Length: 43 km (27 mi)
- Basin size: 184 km^{2} (71 sq mi)

Basin features
- Progression: Argeș→ Danube→ Black Sea
- Tributaries
  - left: Pârâul Grecilor
  - right: Cârcinovel

The Cârcinov is a left tributary of the river Argeș in Romania. It discharges into the Argeș near Topoloveni. It flows through the towns and villages Boțești, Dobrești, Beleți, Albotele, Priboieni, Gorănești, Crintești, Boțârcani, Țigănești and Topoloveni. Its length is 43 km (27 mi) and its basin size is 184 km^{2} (71 sq mi).
