= Vârtej =

- Location within Romania

Location
- Country: Romania
- Counties: Argeș County
- Villages: Cotmenița, Băbana, Metofu, Sămara

Physical characteristics
- Mouth: Cotmeana
  - coordinates: 44.8088°N 24.7039°E
- Length: 21 km (13 mi)
- Basin size: 56 km^{2} (22 sq mi)

Basin features
- Progression: Cotmeana→ Vedea→ Danube→ Black Sea

The Vârtej is a left tributary of the river Cotmeana in Romania. It flows into the Cotmeana near Poiana Lacului. Its length is 21 km (13 mi) and its basin size is 56 km^{2} (22 sq mi).
