= Pârâul Grecilor =

- Location within Romania

Location
- Country: Romania
- Counties: Argeș County
- Villages: Moșteni-Greci, Dobrești

Physical characteristics
- Mouth: Cârcinov
  - location: Dobrești
  - coordinates: 44.9687°N 25.1258°E
- Length: 10 km (6.2 mi)
- Basin size: 14 km^{2} (5.4 sq mi)

Basin features
- Progression: Cârcinov→ Argeș→ Danube→ Black Sea

The Pârâul Grecilor is a left tributary of the river Cârcinov in Romania. It flows into the Cârcinov in Dobrești. Its length is 10 km (6.2 mi) and its basin size is 14 km^{2} (5.4 sq mi).
