= Lipia =

Lipia may refer to several villages in Romania:

- Lipia, a village in Săpata Commune, Argeș County
- Lipia, a village in Merei Commune, Buzău County
- Lipia, a village in Gruiu Commune, Ilfov County

It may also refer to the education institution in Indonesia, LIPIA
