= Cocu, Argeș =

Cocu
- Commune
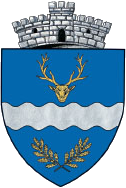
- Coat of arms

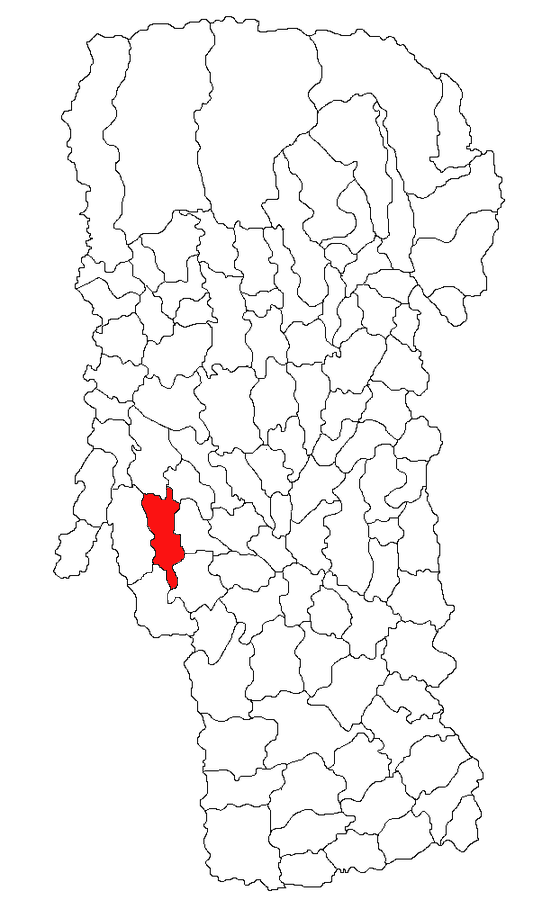
- Location in Argeș County

- Location in Romania
- Coordinates: 44°52′N 24°39′E
- Country: Romania
- County: Argeș

Government
  - Mayor (2020–2024): Gheorghe Țucă (PSD)
- Area: 58.98 km^{2} (22.77 sq mi)
- Elevation: 333 m (1,093 ft)
- Population (2021-12-01): 2,068
  - Density: 35/km^{2} (91/sq mi)
- Time zone: EET/EEST (UTC+2/+3)
- Postal code: 117265
- Area code: (+40) 0248
- Vehicle reg.: AG
- Website: www.cjarges.ro/web/cocu

Cocu is a commune in Argeș County, Muntenia, Romania. It is composed of eight villages: Bărbătești, Cocu, Crucișoara, Făcălețești, Greabănu, Popești, Răchițele de Jos (the commune centre), and Răchițele de Sus.

The commune lies in the Wallachian Plain, on the banks of the river Cotmeana. It is located in the western part of Argeș County, 20 km (12 mi) from the county seat, Pitești. It is crossed by county road DJ703A, which connects it to the north to Cotmeana and to the south to Poiana Lacului and Albota.

== Natives ==
- Constantin Doncea (1904–1973), communist activist and politician
