= Negești =

Negeşti may refer to several villages in Romania:

- Negeşti, a village in Scărişoara Commune, Alba County
- Negeşti, a village in Cotmeana Commune, Argeș County
