= Mârghia =

- Location within Romania

Location
- Country: Romania
- Counties: Olt County, Argeș County
- Villages: Bădicea, Moțoești, Mârghia de Sus, Mârghia de Jos

Physical characteristics
- Mouth: Cotmeana
  - coordinates: 44.6316°N 24.7477°E
- Length: 22 km (14 mi)
- Basin size: 43 km^{2} (17 sq mi)

Basin features
- Progression: Cotmeana→ Vedea→ Danube→ Black Sea
- River code: IX.1.6.4

The Mârghia is a right tributary of the river Cotmeana in Romania. It flows into the Cotmeana near Ciești. Its length is 22 km (14 mi) and its basin size is 43 km^{2} (17 sq mi).
