= Izbășești =

Izbăşeşti may refer to several villages in Romania:

- A village in the Stolnici commune, Argeș County
  - Castra of Izbășești, an earthen fort in the Roman province of Dacia
- A village in Milcoiu Commune, Vâlcea County

== See also ==
- Izbașa (disambiguation)
