= Boțești =

Boţeşti may refer to several places in Romania:

- Boțești, Argeș, a commune in Argeș County
- Boțești, Vaslui, a commune in Vaslui County
- Boţeşti, a village in Girov Commune, Neamţ County

== See also ==
- Boteşti (disambiguation)
