= Castra of Izbășești =

Fort in the Roman province of Dacia

- Location within Romania
- 44°35′N 24°36′E
- Location: Corbeasca Hill, Izbășești, Argeș, Romania

History
- Founded: unknown
- Abandoned: unknown

Site notes
- Condition: Ruined

The Castra of Izbășești was a fort made of earth in the Roman province of Dacia. Erected and abandoned at an uncertain date, the fort was part of the Limes Transalutanus. Traces of the one time earthwork can be identified on the Corbeasca Hill at Izbășești (commune Stolnici, Romania).

== See also ==
- List of castra
