= Negrești (disambiguation) =

Negrești is a town in Vaslui County, Romania.

Negrești may also refer to:

- Negrești, Strășeni, a commune in Strășeni district, Moldova
- Negrești, Neamț, a commune in Neamț County, Romania
- Negrești, a village in Mogoș Commune, Alba County, Romania
- Negrești, a village in Beleți-Negrești Commune, Argeș County, Romania
- Negrești, a village in Mihălășeni Commune, Botoșani County, Romania
- Negrești, a village in Cobadin Commune, Constanța County, Romania
- Negrești, a village in Malovăț Commune, Mehedinți County, Romania
- Negrești, a village in Bâra Commune, Neamț County, Romania
- Negrești-Oaș, a town in Satu Mare County, Romania
