= Constantin Cristescu =

Romanian general

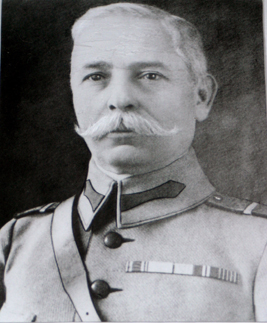
- General Constantin Cristescu
- Born: February 12, 1866; Pădureți, Argeș County, Romanian United Principalities
- Died: May 9, 1923 (aged 57); Bucharest, Kingdom of Romania
- Burial place: Bucharest, Romania
- Education: Cavalry Officers School; École Polytechnique; School of Applied Artillery

Chief of Staff of the Romanian Army
- In office 2 December 1913 – 1 April 1914
- Prime Minister: Titu Maiorescu; Ion I. C. Brătianu
- Preceded by: Alexandru Averescu
- Succeeded by: Vasile Zottu

Chief of Staff of the Romanian Army
- In office 1 April 1918 – 28 October 1918
- Prime Minister: Alexandru Averescu; Alexandru Marghiloman; Constantin Coandă
- Preceded by: Constantin Prezan
- Succeeded by: Constantin Prezan

Chief of Staff of the Romanian Army
- In office 1 April 1920 – 8 May 1923
- Prime Minister: Alexandru Averescu; Take Ionescu; Ion I. C. Brătianu
- Preceded by: Constantin Prezan
- Succeeded by: Alexandru Gorsky
- Military career
- Allegiance: Romanian Army
- Branch: Infantry
- Rank: lieutenant general
- Commands: Romanian 4th Army; Romanian 1st Army
- Conflicts: Second Balkan War; World War I; Romanian campaign; Battle of Mărășești
- Awards: Officer of the Order of the Star of Romania; Officer of the Order of the Crown (Romania); Grand officer of the Order of Franz Joseph; Grand officer of the Order of St. Sava

Constantin Cristescu (2 December 1866 — 9 May 1923) was a Romanian lieutenant general during World War I, and Chief of Staff of the Romanian Army.

== Biography ==
=== Early life ===
He was born on 2 December 1866 in Pădureți village, in Argeș County. He attended the gymnasium in Pitești and the School for Sons of Military in Craiova. In 1887 he graduated first in his class from the Infantry and Cavalry Officers School in Bucharest, with the rank of second lieutenant. Cristescu pursued his studies at the École Polytechnique in Paris in 1890, the School of Artillery and Engineering Application of Fontainebleau in 1892, and the Superior School of War in Paris in 1894.

=== Military career ===
Cristescu was promoted to lieutenant (1890), captain (1894), major (1902), lieutenant colonel (1907), and colonel (1910). He became Chief of the Romanian General Staff on 2 December 1913, and served in this role until 1 April 1914. He played an important role in the development of the operational plans of the Romanian Army in the years prior to the entry of Romania in World War I, including the Hypothesis Z plan. He was promoted to brigadier general in 1914.

=== World War I ===
During the Romanian Campaign of World War I, Cristescu was Chief of Staff of the 2nd and 3rd Romanian Armies and later of Army Group General Averescu. From 10 November to 5 December 1916 he was Commander of the Northern Army. In 1917 he was promoted to major general. In June of that year he took command of the Romanian 1st Army, during the operations leading up to the Battle of Mărășești, against the German 9th Army. The German offensive began on 24 July with a sustained artillery bombardment. Despite the failure of large Russian units that refused to fight and retreated, the 1st Army together with the remaining troops of the Russian 4th Army fought back. Cristescu took upon himself the difficult task of reconstituting the front line; a single front was created through fierce fighting, supported by a strong artillery barrage, and by 6 August the German attack was repulsed. He continued to lead the 1st Army Mărășești until 11 August, when he was succeeded by General Eremia Grigorescu.

In 1918 Cristescu was promoted to Lieutenant General. He served for a second time as Chief of the General Staff from 1 April to 28 October 1918.

=== After the War ===
After the end of the War, Cristescu served for a third and final term as Chief of the General Staff (1 April 1920 to 8 May 1923), during which time he coordinated the organization of the new national Army of Greater Romania. He died on 9 May 1923 in Bucharest, and was buried at Bellu Cemetery, in the same city.

== Awards ==
- Officer of the Order of the Star of Romania (1904)
- Officer of the Order of the Crown (Romania, 1909)
- Order of Bene Merenti of the Royal House, 1st class (Romania, 1910)
- Grand officer of the Order of Franz Joseph (Austria-Hungary)
- Grand officer of the Order of St. Sava (Serbia, 1913)

== Legacy ==
In Bucharest, Pitești, and Slatina streets are named General Constantin Cristescu after him. Also, schools in Bogați and Lunca Corbului bear his name.
