= Izvoru oil field =

Oil field in Argeș County, Romania

Izvoru
- Country: Romania
- Region: Argeș County
- Offshore/onshore: onshore
- Operator: Petrom

Field history
- Discovery: 1968
- Start of production: 1980

Production
- Estimated oil in place: 2.95 million tonnes (~ 3.5×10^{6} m^{3} or 22 million bbl)

The Izvoru oil field is an oil field located in Izvoru, Argeș County, Romania. It was discovered in 1968 and developed by Petrom. It began production in 1980 and produces oil. The total proven reserves of the Izvoru oil field are around 22 million barrels (2.95 million tonnes), and production is centered on 800 barrels per day (130 m^{3}/d).
