= Slătioarele =

Slătioarele may refer to several villages in Romania:

- Slătioarele, a village in Băbana Commune, Argeș County
- Slătioarele, a village in Jilavele Commune, Ialomiţa County
- Slătioarele, a village in Ocnele Mari Commune, Vâlcea County
