= Cuca, Argeș =

Cuca
- Commune
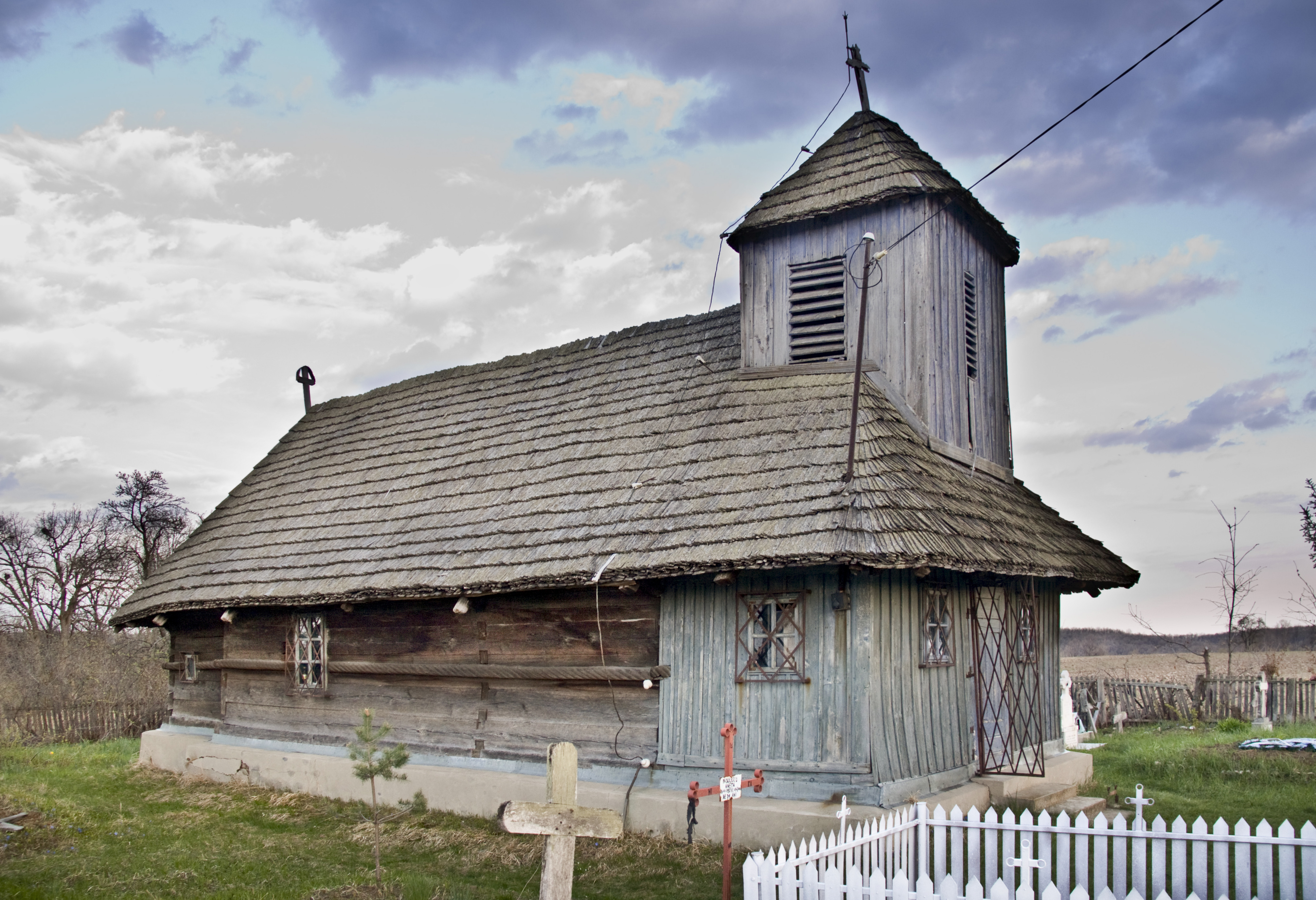
- Wooden church in Bărbălani

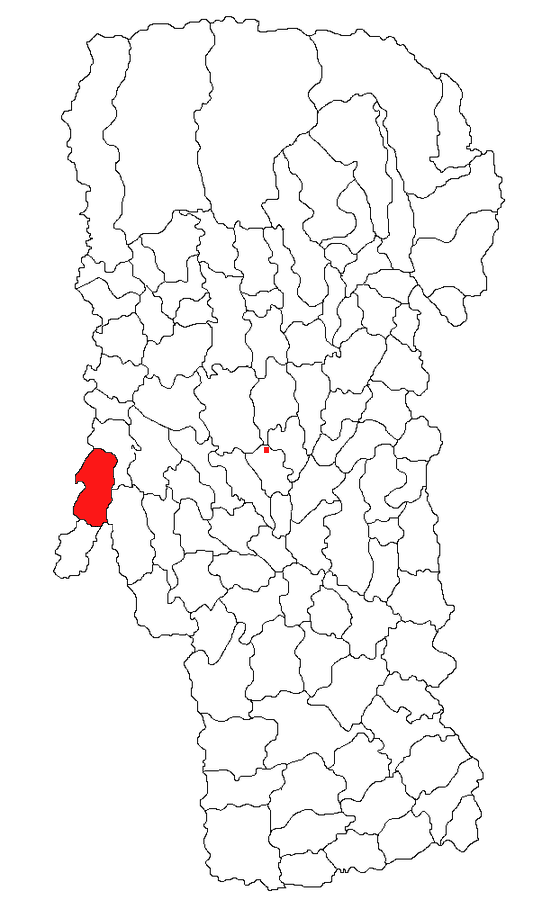
- Location in Argeș County

- Location in Romania
- Coordinates: 44.9326°N 24.5166°E
- Country: Romania
- County: Argeș

Government
  - Mayor (2024–2028): Teodor-Georgian Drăgușin (PSD)
- Area: 50 km^{2} (19 sq mi)
- Elevation: 694 m (2,277 ft)
- Population (2021-12-01): 1,837
  - Density: 37/km^{2} (95/sq mi)
- Time zone: UTC+02:00 (EET)
  - Summer (DST): UTC+03:00 (EEST)
- Postal code: 117330
- Area code: +(40) 248
- Vehicle reg.: AG
- Website: primariacuca.ro

Cuca is a commune in Argeș County, Muntenia, Romania. It is composed of fourteen villages: Bălțata, Bărbălani, Cârcești, Cotu, Crivățu, Cuca, Lăunele de Sus, Măcăi, Mănești, Sinești, Stănicei, Teodorești, Valea Cucii and Vonigeasa. It was one of the most remote places in Romania. Today, in Romanian, Cuca Măcăii means "a remote village or place, very difficult to reach".

== History ==
The oldest document about Cuca is from April 3, 1853, referring to an even older document, from 1537. The commune was formed in 1968 at its current shape by merging the former communes Cuca and Lăunele. Another former commune was Măcăi.

== Geography ==
Cuca is placed in the Getic Platform, subdivision Cotmeana Platform. The relief is segmented by many parallel valleys, while the villages are on the top of the hills, separated by forest areas. The rivers flow from north to south, south-east or south-west. The valleys dry up in summer. The altitude varies from 390 to 530 metres (1,280 to 1,740 ft).

The climate is temperate, with moderate summers and cold winters. The humidity is usually high.

== Villages ==
The commune includes 14 small villages (the largest number in Argeș County).

Village	Distance from center	Etymology	Population
Cuca	center	Open in the roof for illumination; isolated hill	429
Crivăț	1 km E	Winter wind	98
Bălțata	1 km N	Bălțatu family name	38
Cârcești	14 km E	Cârciu family name	292
Vonigeasa	8 km E	Voineagu family name	52
Sinești	6 km S	Sin or Sinescu family name	386
Mănești	5 km W	Manea or Mănescu family name	49
Măcăi	8 km W	founded by Măcău family	100
Stănicei	7 km W	Stănică (proper name)	54
Valea Cucii	9 km W	Romanian translation: Valley of Cuca	118
Lăunele de Sus	5 km S	"la unele" (Romanian translation – to some women)	203
Teodorești	7 km	unknown	332
Cotu	9 km	unknown	116
Bărbălani	17 km	unknown	78

== Transportation ==
There are two national roads close to Cuca:

- DN 7 (or E81) Pitești – Râmnicu Vâlcea
- DN 67b Pitești – Drăgășani.

From these roads, the access way to Cuca is via local county roads:

- DJ 678a (asphalted) connects Cuca to South with Vâlcea County and DN 67b.
- DJ 678e (unasphalted) connects Teodorești village with DJ 678a.
- DJ 703 (asphalted to North and unasphalted to South) connects Cuca with DN 7 to North and with DN 67b to South, in Olt County.

The distances to the nearest towns are:

- Pitești 42 km
- Râmnicu Vâlcea 32 km
- Curtea de Argeș 52 km
- Drăgășani 52 km
- Slatina 80 km
- Bucharest 164 km.

== Economy ==
=== Resources ===
Cuca has two major resources: forests and fruit trees. The forests cover a big part of the commune and all the villages have direct access to the wooded areas. Nearly all the remaining terrain is used for fruit trees (mainly plum trees). The fruits are used to make țuică, a Romanian alcoholic drink.

=== Firms ===
There are 21 firms in the commune, including a pharmaceutical point and small local shops. There are no industrial or agricultural companies. The big distances to nearby cities (see #transportation) and the lack of bus lines makes it very difficult for the local population to find a good job.

=== Problems ===
The main problem for the economy is isolation (see #Transportation). The second problem is the lack of water. Some people say that in Cuca, water is as precious as in Sahara Desert. The villages are on the top of the hills and the rivers are about 100 m below the villages and they dry up in summer (see #Geography). The phreatic waters are even deeper, so permanent phreatic water exists more than 100 m below the river valleys. Pumping water from such depth is nearly impossible. A water pipeline was constructed to bring water to the villages in Cuca. For this, the pipe had to be longer than 100 km. It drains water from the river Topolog and continues south to other communes with similar water problems.

== The legend of Cuca Măcăii ==
In Romanian, Cuca Măcăii defines a remote village or place, very difficult to reach. It is still unknown how this expression appeared. However, the Măcăi village is called by the locals Cuca Măcăii. Many people associate the commune Cuca with Cuca Măcăii. The entire commune is formed by small villages, isolated in the forest (see Villages). In the past, transportation was very difficult. Until 1922 the national road DN 67b did not exist. Older maps show that even the road that connects Pitești and Râmnicu Vâlcea did not exist. Being isolated by sharp valleys and long, parallel hills (see Geography), the land where Cuca is today must have been a very isolated place.
