= Izvoru =

- Commune
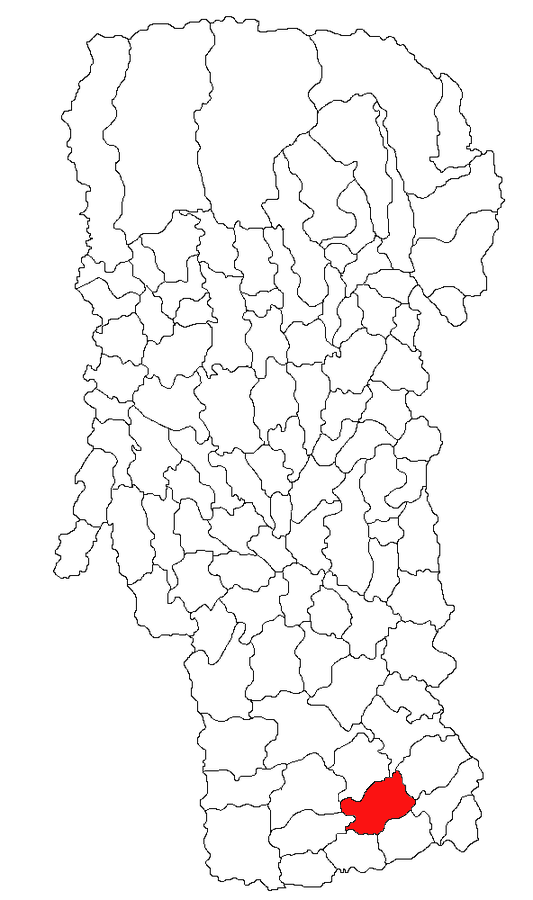
- Location in Argeș County

- Location in Romania
- Coordinates: 44°29′N 25°04′E
- Country: Romania
- County: Argeș

Government
  - Mayor (2020–2024): Claudiu Ionuț Neguț (PNL)
- Area: 61.18 km^{2} (23.62 sq mi)
- Elevation: 169 m (554 ft)
- Population (2021-12-01): 2,031
  - Density: 33/km^{2} (86/sq mi)
- Time zone: EET/EEST (UTC+2/+3)
- Postal code: 117405
- Area code: +(40) 248
- Vehicle reg.: AG
- Website: www.cjarges.ro/en/web/izvoru

Izvoru is a commune in Argeș County, Muntenia, Romania. It is composed of a single village, Izvoru.

The commune is situated in the Wallachian Plain, at an altitude of 169 m (554 ft). It is located in the southern part of the county, 48 km (30 mi) from the county seat, Pitești.

The Izvoru oil field is located on the administrative territory of the commune.

== Natives ==
- Valeriu Gheorghiță (born 1982), military doctor
