= Popești, Argeș =

Popești
- Commune
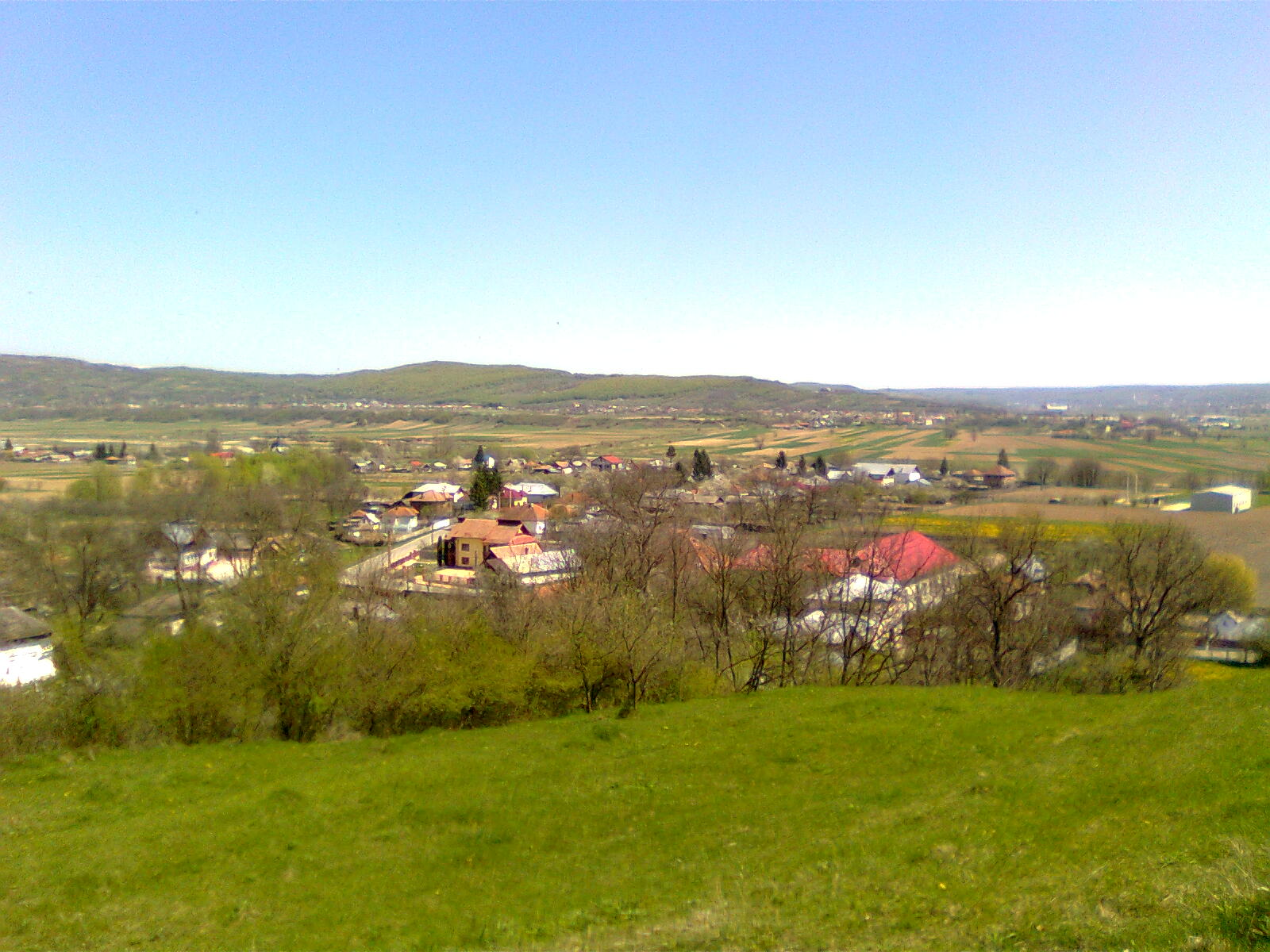
- Purcăreni village

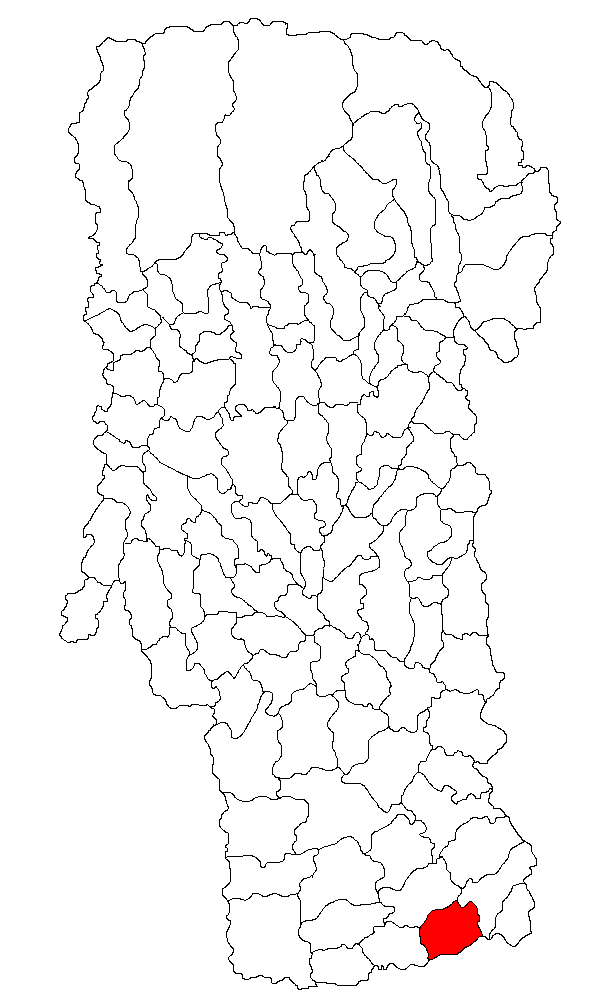
- Location in Argeș County

- Location in Romania
- Coordinates: 44.4583°N 25.1201°E
- Country: Romania
- County: Argeș

Government
  - Mayor (2024–2028): Cornel Trîncă (PSD)
- Elevation: 134 m (440 ft)
- Population (2021-12-01): 1,600
- Time zone: UTC+02:00 (EET)
  - Summer (DST): UTC+03:00 (EEST)
- Postal code: 117590
- Area code: +(40) 248
- Vehicle reg.: AG
- Website: www.cjarges.ro/en/web/popesti

Popești is a commune in Argeș County, Muntenia, Romania. It is composed of four villages: Palanga, Popești, Purcăreni, and Slobozia. It also included Adunați, Bucov, and Râca villages until 2003, when these were split off to form Râca Commune.

Historical population
Year	Pop.	±%
2002	2,661	—
2011	2,191	−17.7%
2021	1,600	−27.0%
Source: Census data

At the 2021 census, the commune had a population of 1,600; of those, 88.12% were Romanians.
