= Râca =

- Commune
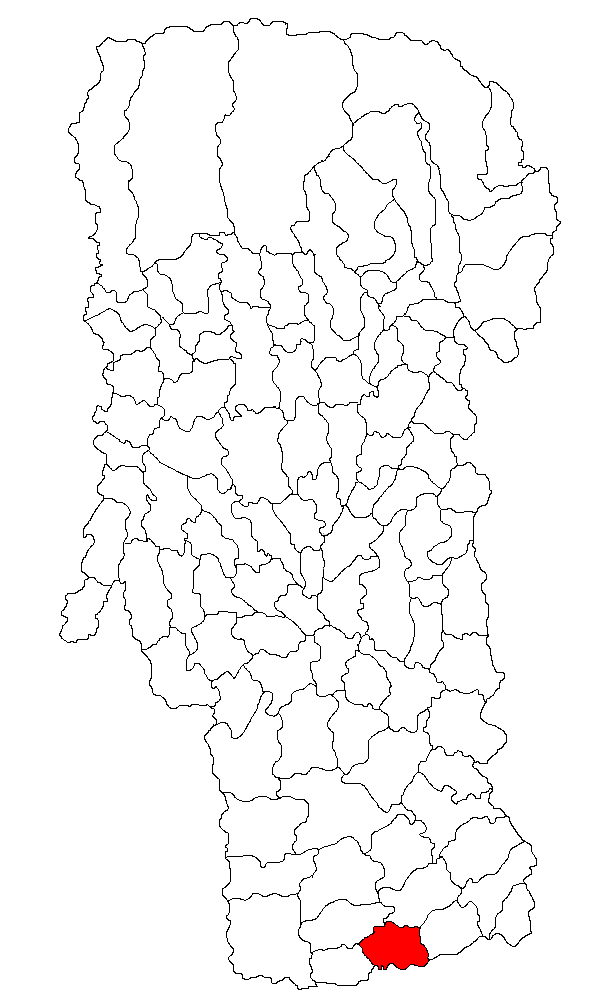
- Location in Argeș County

- Location in Romania
- Coordinates: 44°26′N 25°2′E
- Country: Romania
- County: Argeș

Government
  - Mayor (2020–2024): Nicușor-Sorin Popescu (PSD)
- Area: 42.6 km^{2} (16.4 sq mi)
- Elevation: 165 m (541 ft)
- Population (2021-12-01): 951
  - Density: 22/km^{2} (58/sq mi)
- Time zone: EET/EEST (UTC+2/+3)
- Postal code: 117596
- Vehicle reg.: AG
- Website: www.cjarges.ro/en/web/raca

Râca is a commune in Argeș County, Muntenia, Romania. It is composed of three villages: Adunați, Bucov, and Râca. These were part of Popești Commune until 2003, when they were split off.

The commune lies in the Wallachian Plain. It is located at the southern extremity of Argeș County, on the border with Teleorman County.
