= Căldăraru =

- Commune
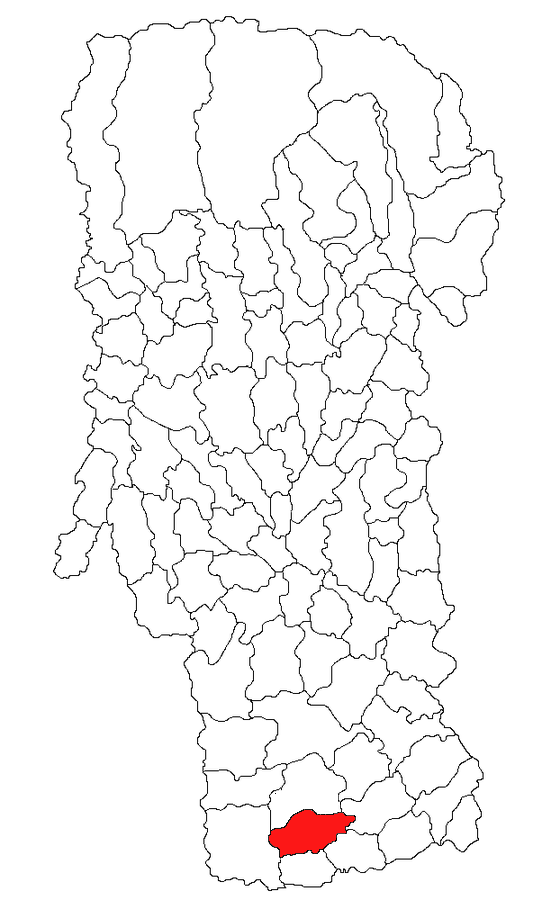
- Location in Argeș County

- Location in Romania
- Coordinates: 44.4613°N 24.9393°E
- Country: Romania
- County: Argeș

Government
  - Mayor (2024–2028): Ionuț Rîcanu (PNL)
- Area: 60.11 km^{2} (23.21 sq mi)
- Elevation: 166 m (545 ft)
- Population (2021-12-01): 2,064
  - Density: 34.34/km^{2} (88.93/sq mi)
- Time zone: UTC+02:00 (EET)
  - Summer (DST): UTC+03:00 (EEST)
- Postal code: 117190
- Area code: +(40) 248
- Vehicle reg.: AG
- Website: www.cjarges.ro/en/web/caldararu/

Căldăraru is a commune in Argeș County, Muntenia, Romania. It is composed of three villages: Burdea, Căldăraru, and Strâmbeni.

== Natives ==
- Ionel Stoicescu (born 1968), sculptor
