= Topoloveni =

- Town
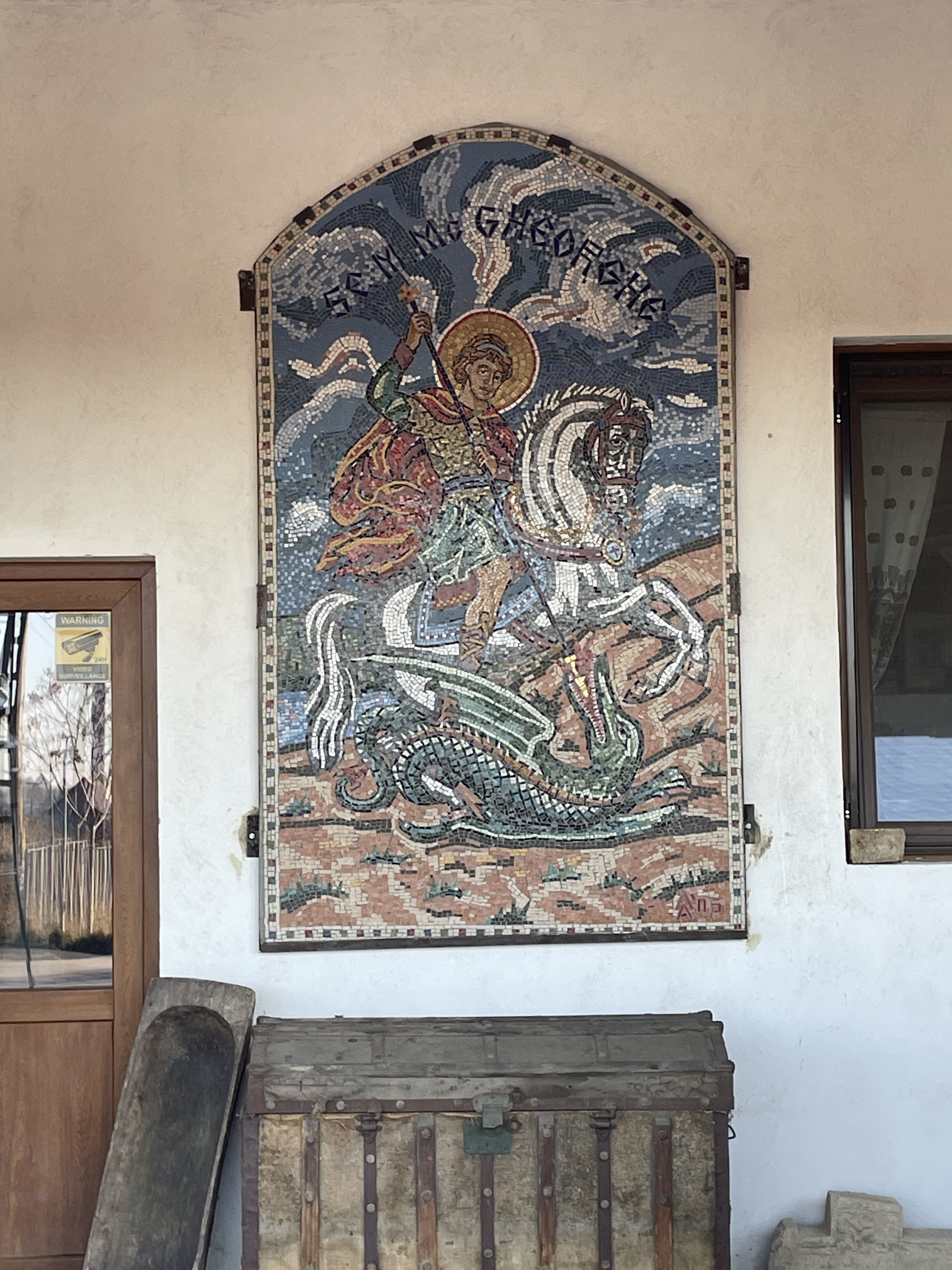
- Ethnographic Museum in Topoloveni

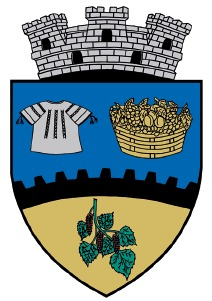
- Coat of arms

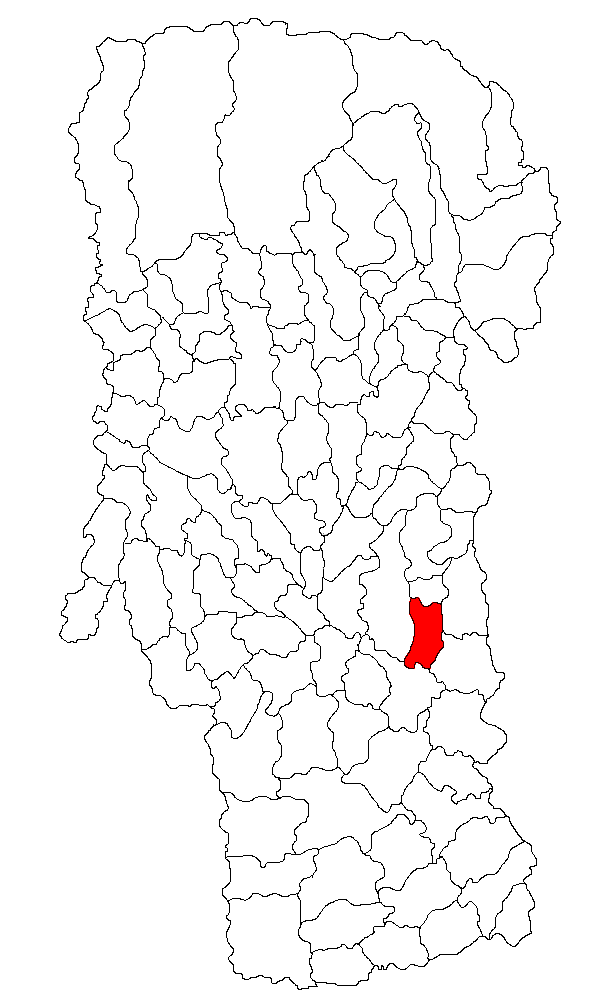
- Location in Argeș County

- Location in Romania
- Coordinates: 44°48′25″N 25°5′2″E
- Country: Romania
- County: Argeș

Government
  - Mayor (2024–2028): Gheorghiță Boțârcă (PSD)
- Area: 33.84 km^{2} (13.07 sq mi)
- Elevation: 250 m (820 ft)
- Population (2021-12-01): 9,373
  - Density: 277.0/km^{2} (717.4/sq mi)
- Time zone: UTC+02:00 (EET)
  - Summer (DST): UTC+03:00 (EEST)
- Postal code: 115500
- Area code: (+40) 02 48
- Vehicle reg.: AG
- Website: www.topoloveni.ro

Topoloveni (Romanian pronunciation: [topoloˈvenʲ]) is a town in Argeș County, Romania on the Cârcinov River. The town administers four villages: Boțârcani, Crintești, Gorănești, and Țigănești. It is situated in the historical region of Muntenia.

The oldest document in which Topoloveni is mentioned is dated 19 June 1421, during the rule of Radu II Chelul. Its name is derived from a Slavic word, topol, meaning "poplar".

The town is known for the Magiun of Topoloveni, a traditional plum-based spread, which has held a Protected Geographical Status from the European Union since 2011.

The Topoloveni Airfield has one runway; it has no ICAO airport code, but the designation RO-0025 is used as reference.

== Demographics ==
At the 2011 census, 10,219 inhabitants were recorded as residents of the five component localities of Topoloveni, as follows: Topoloveni – 4,023, Țigănești – 418, Gorănești – 344, Crintești – 394 and Boțârcani – 361. More recent demographic data accounts for a total of 9,232 residents of Topoloveni. At the 2021 census, the town had a population of 9,373.

Historical population
Year	Pop.	±%
1810	91	—
1956	3,904	+4190.1%
1977	6,196	+58.7%
1992	9,458	+52.6%
2002	10,329	+9.2%
2011	10,037	−2.8%
2021	9,373	−6.6%
Source: Census data

== Natives ==
- Dan Ghica-Radu (born 1955), lieutenant general, chief of the Romanian Land Forces Staff (2009–2011)
- Ion Mihalache (1882–1963), politician, the founder and leader of the Peasants' Party and a main figure of its successor, the National Peasants' Party
