= Izbașa =

Izbașa is a Romanian surname. It derives from the Turkish word yüzbaș which means "head over 100, centurion". People with the surname include:

- Sandra Izbașa (born 1990), Romanian artistic gymnast
- Stana Izbașa (born 1947), Romanian folk singer

== See also ==
- Izbășești (disambiguation)
