= Botești (disambiguation) =

Boteşti may refer to several places in Romania:

- Botești, a commune in Neamţ County
- Boteşti, a village in Câmpeni town, Alba County
- Boteşti, a village in Scărişoara Commune, Alba County
- Boteşti, a village in Zlatna town, Alba County
- Boteşti, a village in Ungureni Commune, Bacău County
- Boteşti, a village in Horodniceni Commune, Suceava County
- Boteşti, a village in Bârna Commune, Timiș County

== See also ==
- Boţeşti (disambiguation)
