= Bârla =

- Commune
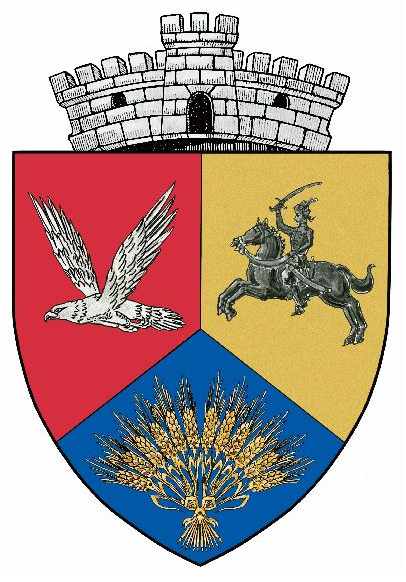
- Coat of arms

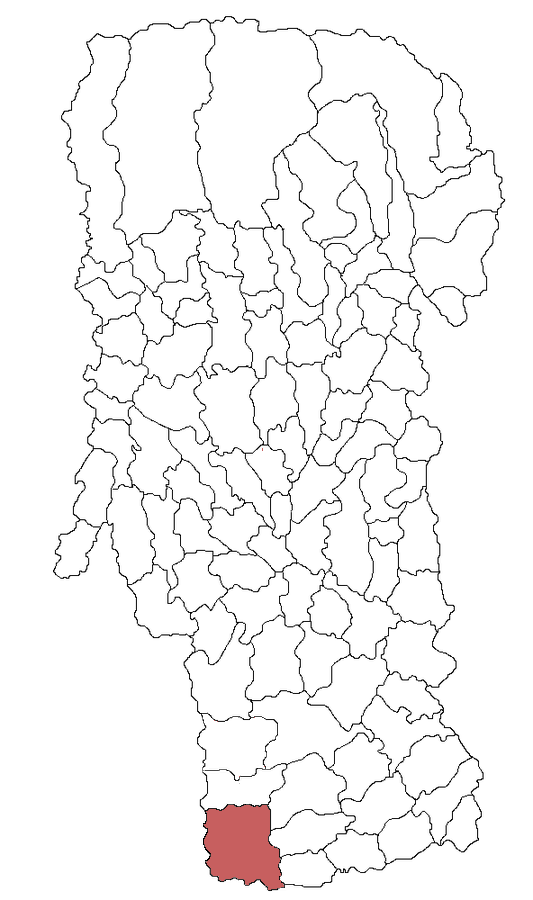
- Location in Argeș County

- Location in Romania
- Coordinates: 44°25′N 24°46′E
- Country: Romania
- County: Argeș

Government
  - Mayor (2024–2028): Gheorghe Voicu (PNL)
- Area: 105.63 km^{2} (40.78 sq mi)
- Elevation: 171 m (561 ft)
- Population (2021-12-01): 4,116
  - Density: 39/km^{2} (100/sq mi)
- Time zone: EET/EEST (UTC+2/+3)
- Postal code: 117090
- Area code: (+40) 0248
- Vehicle reg.: AG
- Website: www.cjarges.ro/en/web/barla/

Bârla is a commune in Argeș County, Muntenia, Romania. It is composed of twelve villages: Afrimești, Bădești, Bârla, Brabeți, Ciocești, Malu, Mândra, Mozăcenii-Vale, Podișoru, Șelăreasca, Urlueni, and Zuvelcați.

Historical population
Year	Pop.	±%
2002	5,855	—
2011	5,142	−12.2%
2021	4,116	−20.0%
Source: Census data
