= Hârsești =

- Commune
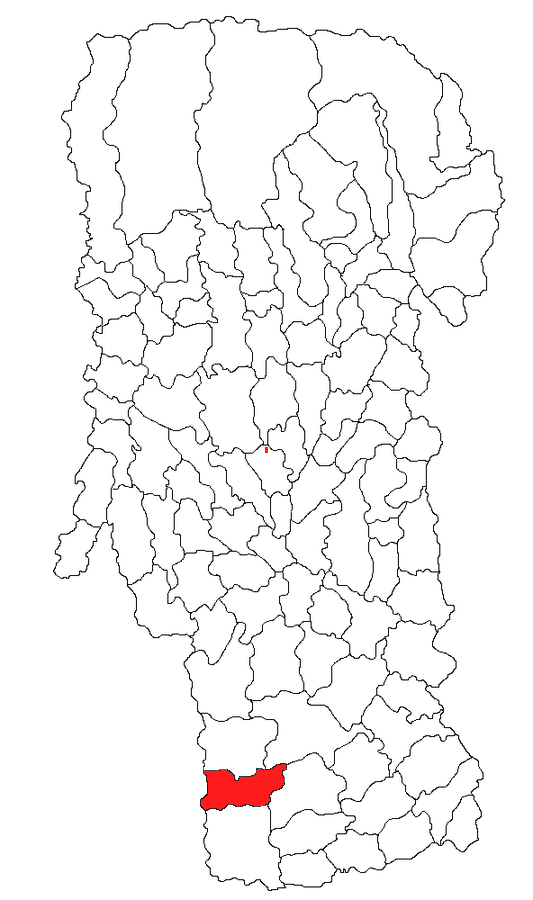
- Location in Argeș County

- Location in Romania
- Coordinates: 44°31′N 24°47′E
- Country: Romania
- County: Argeș

Government
  - Mayor (2020–2024): Ionel Moloiu (PSD)
- Area: 51.64 km^{2} (19.94 sq mi)
- Elevation: 179 m (587 ft)
- Population (2021-12-01): 2,067
  - Density: 40/km^{2} (100/sq mi)
- Time zone: EET/EEST (UTC+2/+3)
- Postal code: 117390
- Area code: +(40) 248
- Vehicle reg.: AG
- Website: www.comunaharsesti.ro

Hârsești is a commune in Argeș County, Muntenia, Romania. It is composed of three villages: Ciobani, Hârsești, and Martalogi.

== Natives ==
- Mircea Fulger (born 1959), light-welterweight boxer
