= Priboieni =

- Commune
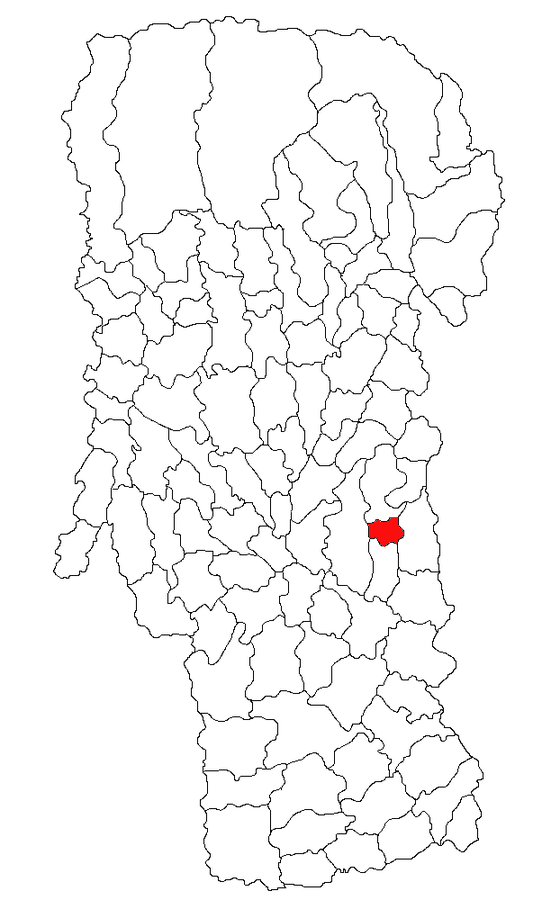
- Location in Argeș County

- Location in Romania
- Coordinates: 44°53′N 25°5′E
- Country: Romania
- County: Argeș

Government
  - Mayor (2024–2028): Sporin Lupu (PSD)
- Area: 23.02 km^{2} (8.89 sq mi)
- Elevation: 277 m (909 ft)
- Population (2021-12-01): 3,274
  - Density: 140/km^{2} (370/sq mi)
- Time zone: EET/EEST (UTC+2/+3)
- Postal code: 117600
- Area code: +(40) 248
- Vehicle reg.: AG
- Website: www.priboieni.ro

Priboieni is a commune in Argeș County, Muntenia, Romania. It is composed of eight villages: Albotele, Paraschivești, Priboieni, Sămăila, Pitoi, Valea Mare, Valea Nenii, and Valea Popii.
