= Lunca Corbului =

- Commune
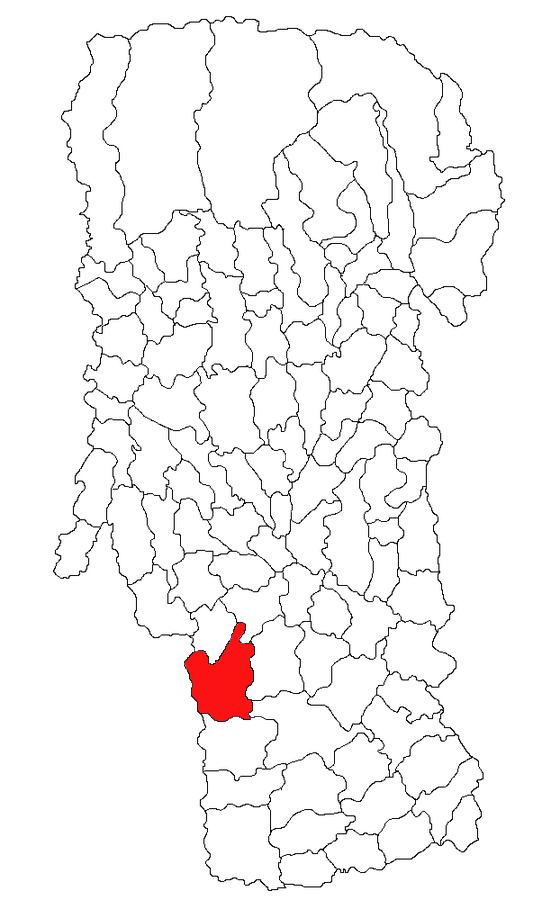
- Location in Argeș County

- Location in Romania
- Coordinates: 44°42′N 24°45′E
- Country: Romania
- County: Argeș

Government
  - Mayor (2024–2028): Gheorghe Drăgan (PSD)
- Area: 103.58 km^{2} (39.99 sq mi)
- Elevation: 236 m (774 ft)
- Population (2021-12-01): 2,485
  - Density: 23.99/km^{2} (62.14/sq mi)
- Time zone: UTC+02:00 (EET)
  - Summer (DST): UTC+03:00 (EEST)
- Postal code: 117435
- Area code: (+40) 0248
- Vehicle reg.: AG
- Website: www.cjarges.ro/en/web/lunca-corbului

Lunca Corbului is a commune in Argeș County, Muntenia, Romania. It is composed of nine villages: Bumbueni, Catane, Ciești, Lăngești, Lunca Corbului, Mârghia de Jos, Mârghia de Sus, Pădureți, and Silișteni.

The commune is situated in the Wallachian Plain, on the banks of the Cotmeana River, at an altitude of 236 m (774 ft). It is located in the southwestern edge of Argeș County, 25 km (16 mi) from the municipality of Pitești, the county seat, and 15 km (9.3 mi) from the town of Costești, on the border with Olt County.

== Natives ==
- Constantin Cristescu (1866–1923), lieutenant general during World War I and Chief of Staff of the Romanian Army
