= Dobrești, Argeș =

Dobrești
- Commune
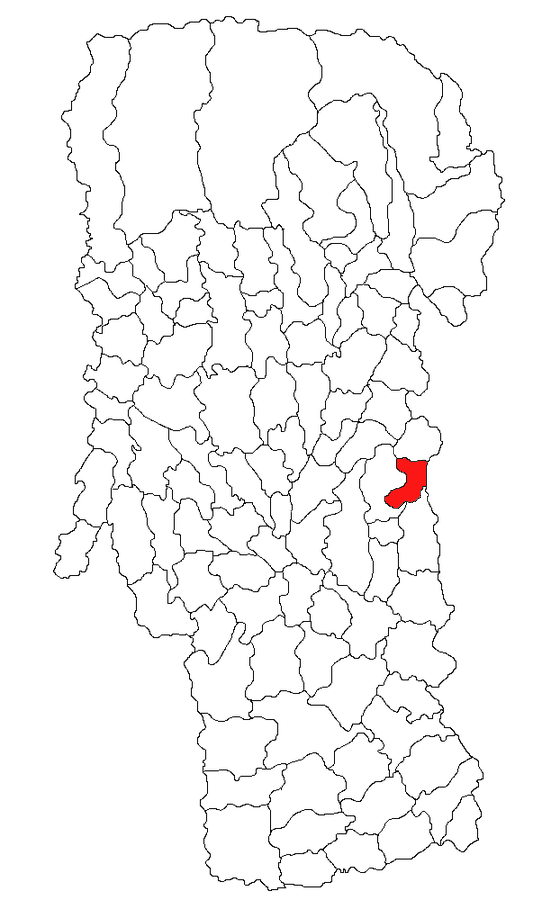
- Location in Argeș County

- Location in Romania
- Coordinates: 44.9515°N 25.1200°E
- Country: Romania
- County: Argeș

Government
  - Mayor (2024–2028): Irinel Georgescu (PSD)
- Area: 39.11 km^{2} (15.10 sq mi)
- Elevation: 365 m (1,198 ft)
- Population (2021-12-01): 1,650
  - Density: 42/km^{2} (110/sq mi)
- Time zone: EET/EEST (UTC+2/+3)
- Postal code: 117365
- Area code: +(40) 248
- Vehicle reg.: AG
- Website: www.cjarges.ro/en/web/dobresti/

Dobrești is a commune in Argeș County, Muntenia, Romania. It is composed of two villages, Dobrești and Furești.
