= Poiana Lacului =

- Commune
- Marketplace in Poiana Lacului

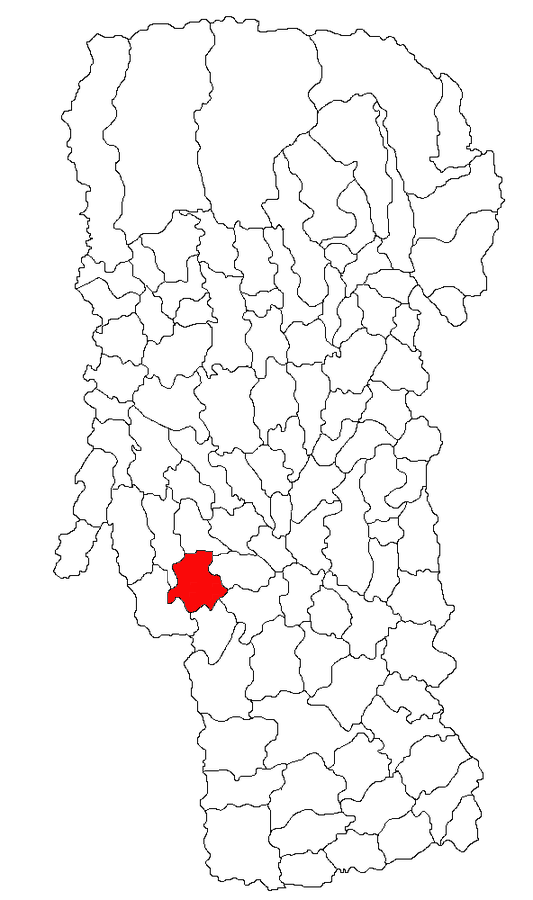
- Location in Argeș County

- Location in Romania
- Coordinates: 44°49′N 24°44′E
- Country: Romania
- County: Argeș

Government
  - Mayor (2020–2024): Ion Dumitrache (PNL)
- Area: 58.51 km^{2} (22.59 sq mi)
- Elevation: 358 m (1,175 ft)
- Population (2021-12-01): 6,136
  - Density: 104.9/km^{2} (271.6/sq mi)
- Time zone: UTC+02:00 (EET)
  - Summer (DST): UTC+03:00 (EEST)
- Postal code: 117555
- Area code: +(40) 248
- Vehicle reg.: AG
- Website: poianalacului.ro

Poiana Lacului is a commune in Argeș County, Muntenia, Romania. It is composed of thirteen villages: Cătunași, Cepari, Dealu Orașului, Dealu Viilor, Dinculești, Gălețeanu, Gărdinești, Gâlcești, Metofu, Păduroiu din Deal, Păduroiu din Vale, Poiana Lacului, and Sămara.

The commune lies on the banks of the river Cotmeana, in a hilly area of the Wallachian Plain. It is located in the central part of Argeș County, 18 km (11 mi) west of the county seat, Pitești.
