= Beleți-Negrești =

- Commune
- Location in Romania
- Coordinates: 44.9634°N 25.0692°E
- Country: Romania
- County: Argeș

Government
  - Mayor (2024–2028): Constantin Cătănea (PSD)
- Area: 49 km^{2} (19 sq mi)
- Elevation: 374 m (1,227 ft)
- Population (2021-12-01): 1,740
  - Density: 36/km^{2} (92/sq mi)
- Time zone: UTC+02:00 (EET)
  - Summer (DST): UTC+03:00 (EEST)
- Postal code: 117114
- Area code: +(40) 248
- Vehicle reg.: AG
- Website: www.cjarges.ro/en/web/beleti-negresti/

Beleți-Negrești is a commune in Argeș County, Muntenia, Romania. It is composed of four villages: Beleți, Lențea, Negrești, and Zgripcești (the commune centre).

Historical population
Year	Pop.	±%
2002	1,974	—
2011	1,941	−1.7%
2021	1,740	−10.4%
Source: Census data
