= Băbana =

- Commune
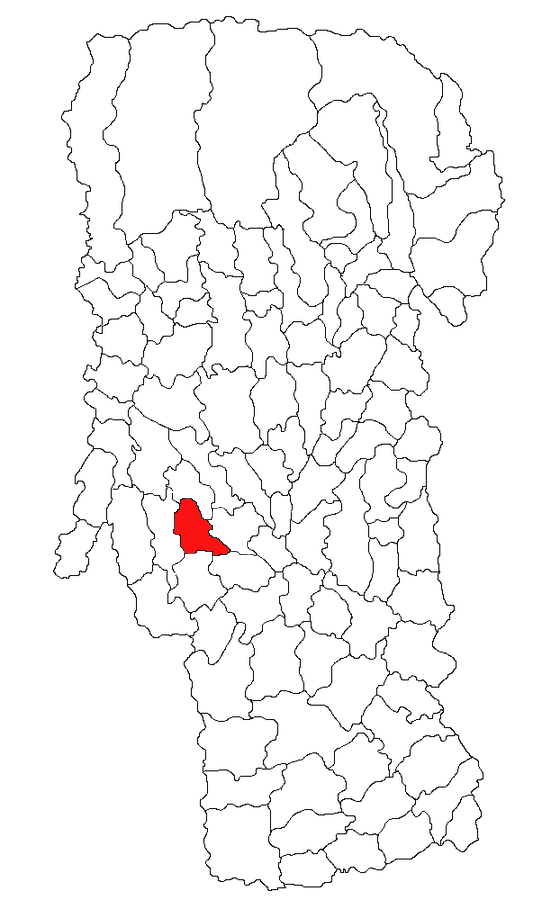
- Location in Argeș County

- Location in Romania
- Coordinates: 44°54′N 24°42′E
- Country: Romania
- County: Argeș

Government
  - Mayor (2020–2024): Vasile Bebe Ivan (PNL)
- Area: 39 km^{2} (15 sq mi)
- Elevation: 346 m (1,135 ft)
- Population (2021-12-01): 3,210
  - Density: 82/km^{2} (210/sq mi)
- Time zone: EET/EEST (UTC+2/+3)
- Postal code: 117055
- Area code: +(40) 248
- Vehicle reg.: AG
- Website: www.primariababana.ro

Băbana is a commune in Argeș County, Muntenia, Romania. It is composed of seven villages: Băbana, Băjănești, Ciobănești, Cotmenița, Groși, Lupueni, and Slătioarele.

Historical population
| Year | Pop. | ±% |
|---|---|---|
| 1970 | 3,348 | — |
| 2002 | 2,829 | −15.5% |
| 2011 | 2,820 | −0.3% |
| 2021 | 3,210 | +13.8% |
Source: Census data
