= Săpata =

- Commune
- Location in Romania
- Coordinates: 44°43′N 24°45′E
- Country: Romania
- County: Argeș
- Population (2021-12-01): 1,513
- Time zone: EET/EEST (UTC+2/+3)
- Vehicle reg.: AG

Săpata is a commune in Argeș County, Muntenia, Romania. It is composed of eight villages: Bănărești, Dealu Bradului, Drăghicești, Găinușa, Lipia, Mârțești (the commune centre), Popești and Turcești.

It is the site of two ancient Roman forts (Sapata de Jos I and II), part of the empire frontier system of the Limes Transalutanus in the province of Roman Dacia.

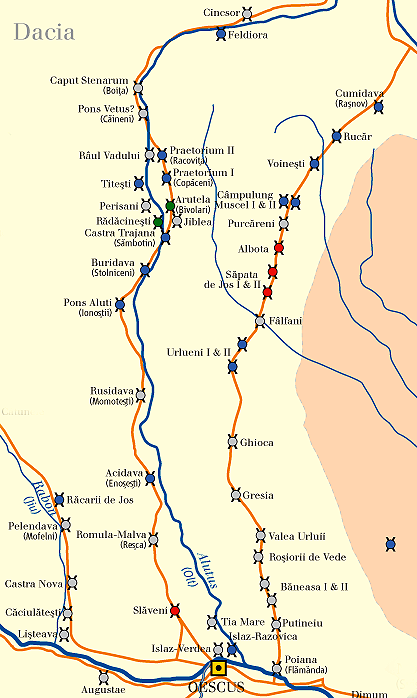
Limes Alutanus + Transalutanus (right)
