= Boțești, Argeș =

Boțești
- Commune
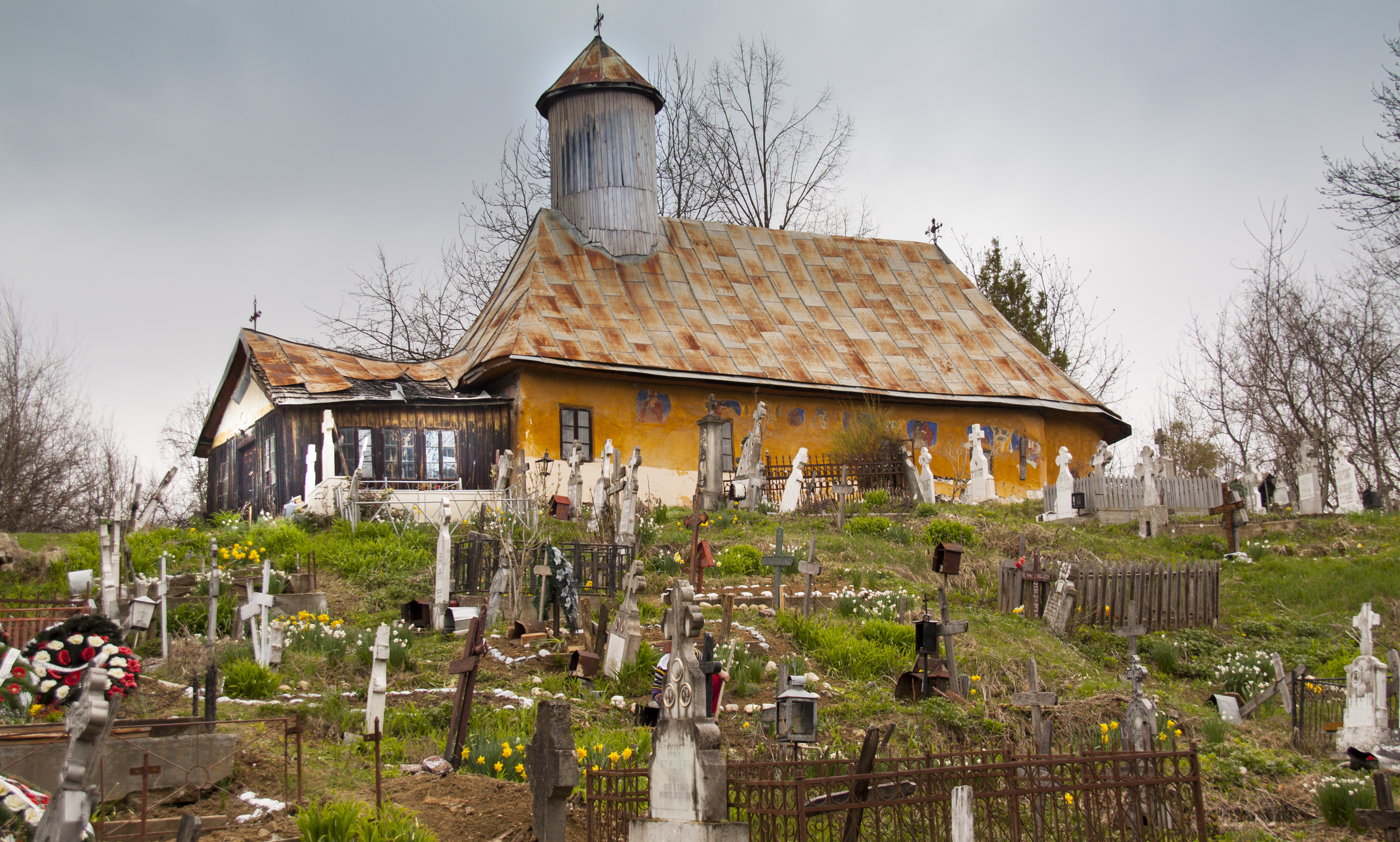
- Wooden church in Moșteni-Greci

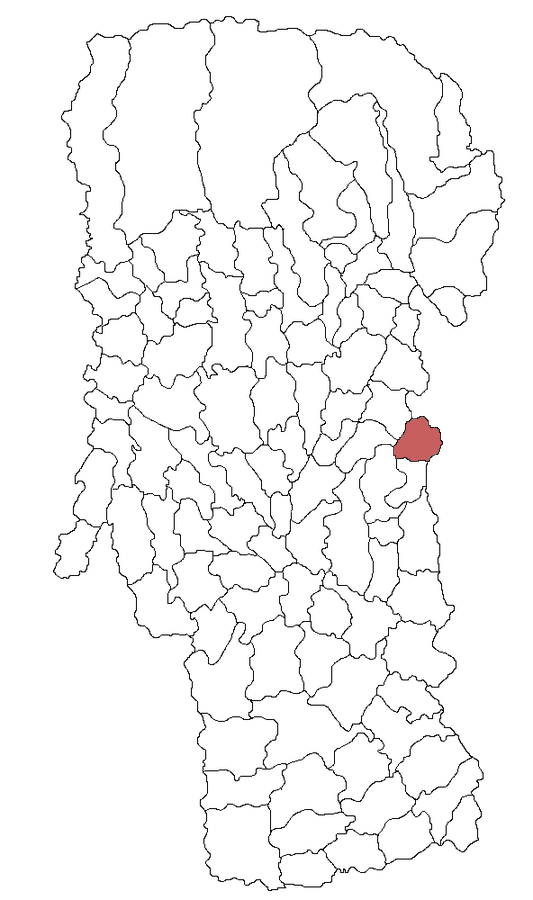
- Location in Argeș County

- Location in Romania
- Coordinates: 45.0062°N 25.1404°E
- Country: Romania
- County: Argeș

Government
  - Mayor (2020–2024): Nicolae-Mihai Bundă (PSD)
- Elevation: 520 m (1,710 ft)
- Population (2021-12-01): 1,035
- Time zone: UTC+02:00 (EET)
  - Summer (DST): UTC+03:00 (EEST)
- Postal code: 117135
- Area code: +(40) 248
- Vehicle reg.: AG
- Website: www.cjarges.ro/en/web/botesti/

Boțești is a commune in Argeș County, Muntenia, Romania. It is composed of two villages: Boțești and Moșteni-Greci.

The commune is right on the 45th parallel north, 45 km (28 mi) northeast of Pitești and 125 km (78 mi) northwest of Bucharest.

Historical population
Year	Pop.	±%
2002	1,345	—
2011	1,207	−10.3%
2021	1,035	−14.3%
Source: Census data

== Natives ==
- Ion Diaconescu (1917–2011), anti-communist activist and politician
