= Stolnici =

- Commune
- Coat of arms

- Location in Romania
- Coordinates: 44.5667°N 24.7833°E
- Country: Romania
- County: Argeș
- Population (2021-12-01): 2,860
- Time zone: UTC+02:00 (EET)
  - Summer (DST): UTC+03:00 (EEST)
- Vehicle reg.: AG

Stolnici is a commune in Argeș County, Muntenia, Romania. It is composed of six villages: Cochinești, Cotmeana, Fâlfani, Izbășești, Stolnici and Vlășcuța.

== Climate ==
Climate data for Stolnici (altitude 209m, 2014–2026 normals, extremes 1980–present)
Month	Jan	Feb	Mar	Apr	May	Jun	Jul	Aug	Sep	Oct	Nov	Dec	Year
Record high °C (°F)	18.5 (65.3)	21.7 (71.1)	26.3 (79.3)	30.1 (86.2)	32.8 (91.0)	37.8 (100.0)	40.8 (105.4)	39.8 (103.6)	36.3 (97.3)	30.8 (87.4)	26.6 (79.9)	19.3 (66.7)	40.8 (105.4)
Mean daily maximum °C (°F)	4.9 (40.8)	7.8 (46.0)	12.4 (54.3)	17.9 (64.2)	22.7 (72.9)	28.4 (83.1)	31.2 (88.2)	31.6 (88.9)	26.1 (79.0)	18.5 (65.3)	10.9 (51.6)	6.4 (43.5)	18.2 (64.8)
Daily mean °C (°F)	0.4 (32.7)	3.1 (37.6)	6.9 (44.4)	11.6 (52.9)	16.5 (61.7)	21.7 (71.1)	23.9 (75.0)	24.1 (75.4)	19.3 (66.7)	12.5 (54.5)	6.9 (44.4)	2.7 (36.9)	12.5 (54.4)
Mean daily minimum °C (°F)	−4.0 (24.8)	−1.6 (29.1)	1.4 (34.5)	5.2 (41.4)	10.2 (50.4)	14.9 (58.8)	16.6 (61.9)	16.7 (62.1)	12.4 (54.3)	6.5 (43.7)	2.8 (37.0)	−1.0 (30.2)	6.7 (44.0)
Record low °C (°F)	−23.9 (−11.0)	−23.5 (−10.3)	−22.1 (−7.8)	−4.2 (24.4)	−0.6 (30.9)	3.6 (38.5)	8.3 (46.9)	7.4 (45.3)	−0.4 (31.3)	−3.0 (26.6)	−16.4 (2.5)	−16.3 (2.7)	−23.9 (−11.0)
Average precipitation mm (inches)	44.1 (1.74)	27.2 (1.07)	51.7 (2.04)	39.5 (1.56)	70.5 (2.78)	67.4 (2.65)	61.2 (2.41)	27.3 (1.07)	43.4 (1.71)	52.7 (2.07)	57.7 (2.27)	48.1 (1.89)	590.8 (23.26)
Average precipitation days (≥ 1.0 mm)	7.1	5.9	6.8	6.4	9.1	7.7	5.8	3.5	4.2	5.3	7.3	6.5	75.6
Average snowy days	5.1	3.5	2.0	0	0	0	0	0	0	0	1.0	2.6	14.2
Source: Meteomanz (2014-2026); Infoclimat (1980-2010)
