= Cotmeana =

- Commune
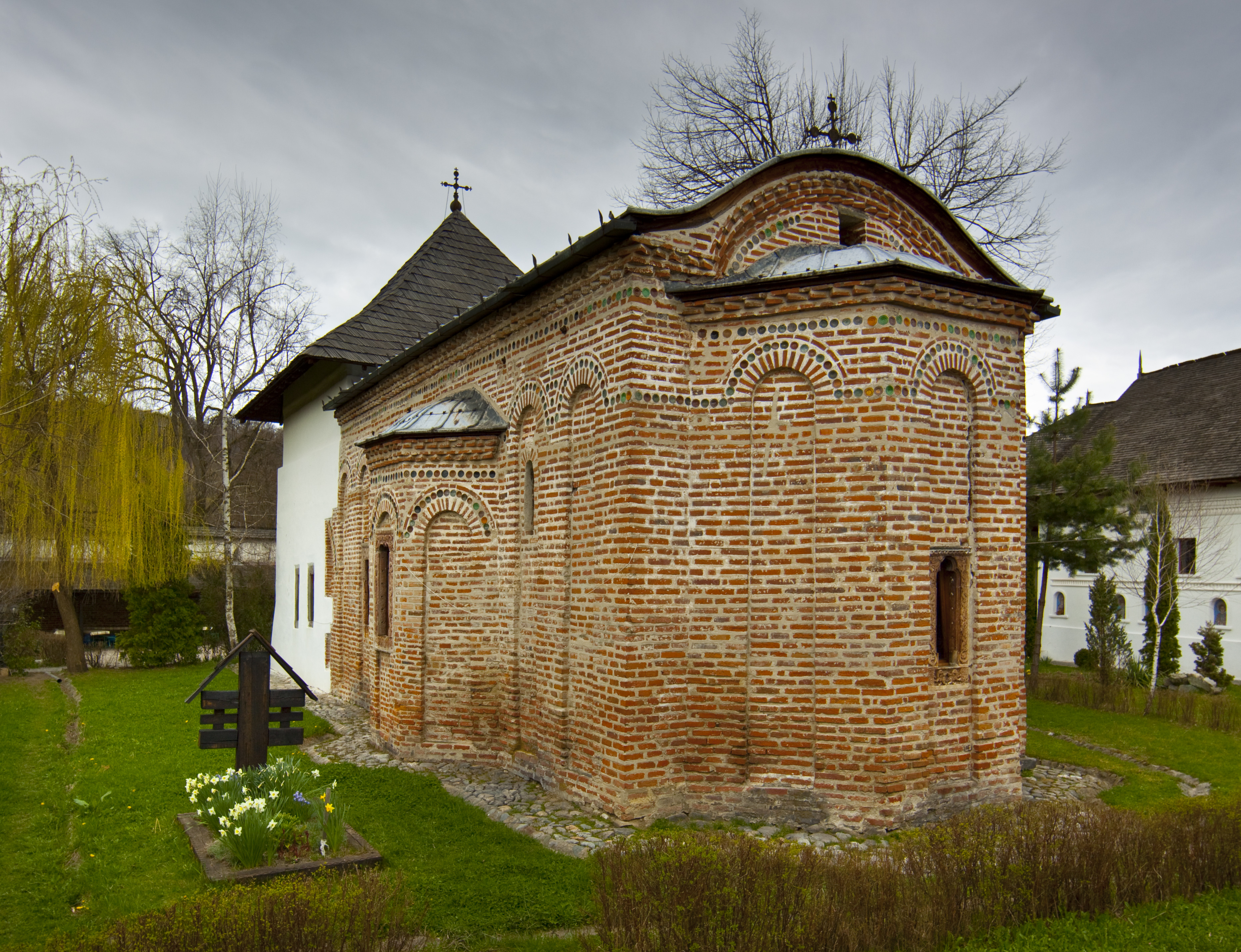
- Cotmeana Monastery

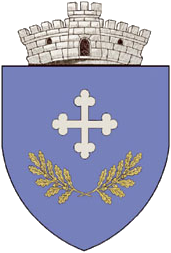
- Coat of arms

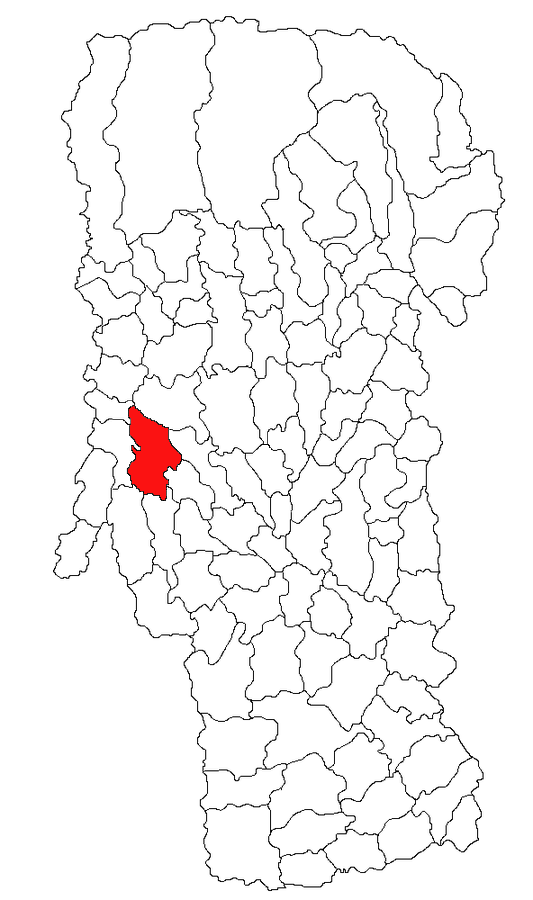
- Location in Argeș County

- Location in Romania
- Coordinates: 44°36′N 24°45′E
- Country: Romania
- County: Argeș

Government
  - Mayor (2020–2024): Ionel Dragoș Vișan (PSD)
- Area: 73.72 km^{2} (28.46 sq mi)
- Elevation: 450 m (1,480 ft)
- Population (2021-12-01): 1,849
  - Density: 25.08/km^{2} (64.96/sq mi)
- Time zone: UTC+02:00 (EET)
  - Summer (DST): UTC+03:00 (EEST)
- Postal code: 117687
- Area code: +(40) 248
- Vehicle reg.: AG

Cotmeana is a commune in Argeș County, Muntenia, Romania. It is composed of fourteen villages: Bascovele, Bunești, Costești, Cotmeana, Dealu Pădurii, Drăgolești, Lintești, Negești, Pielești, Săndulești, Spiridoni, Ursoaia, Vârloveni, and Zamfirești.
