= Argeș County =

County of Romania

Argeș County Județul Argeș
- County
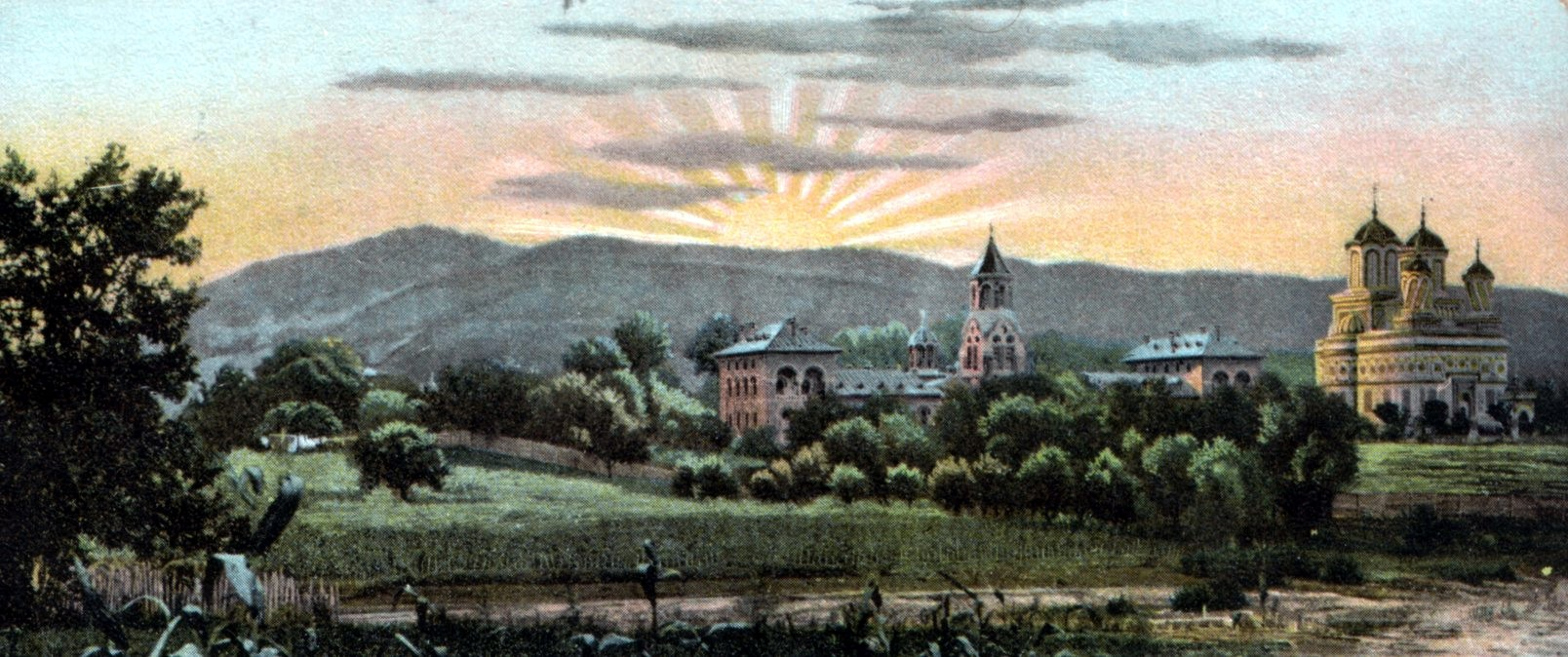
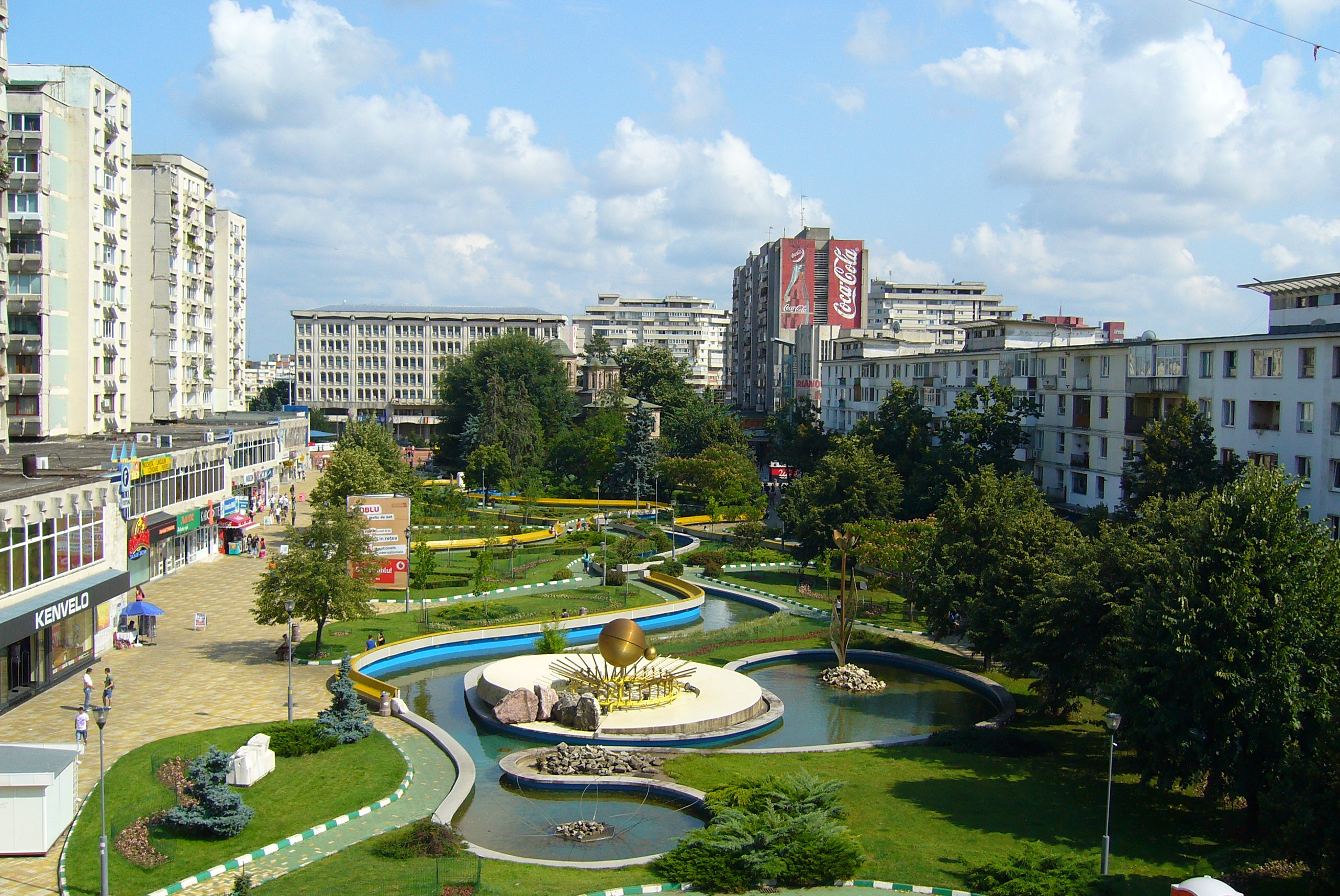
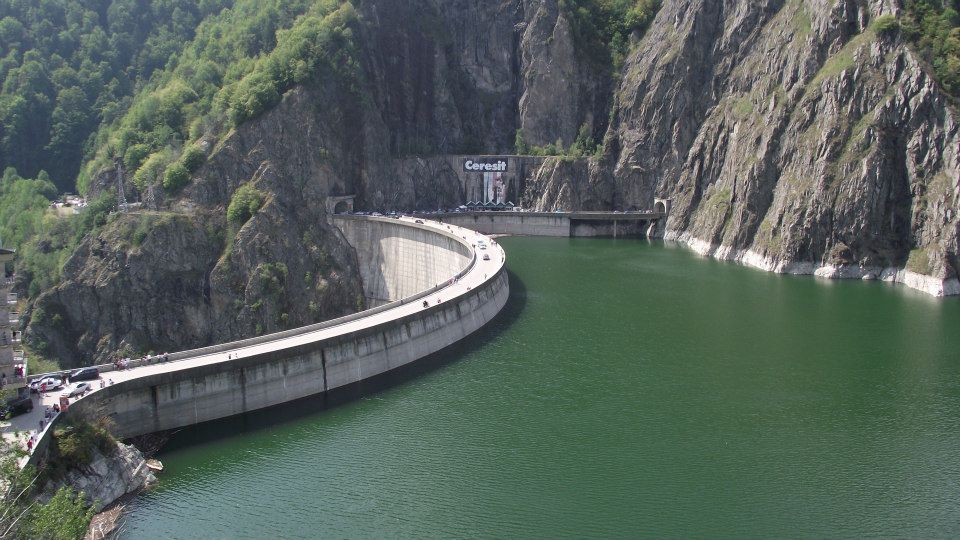
- Curtea de Argeș in 1907 Pitești Lake Vidraru and Dam in northern Argeș County

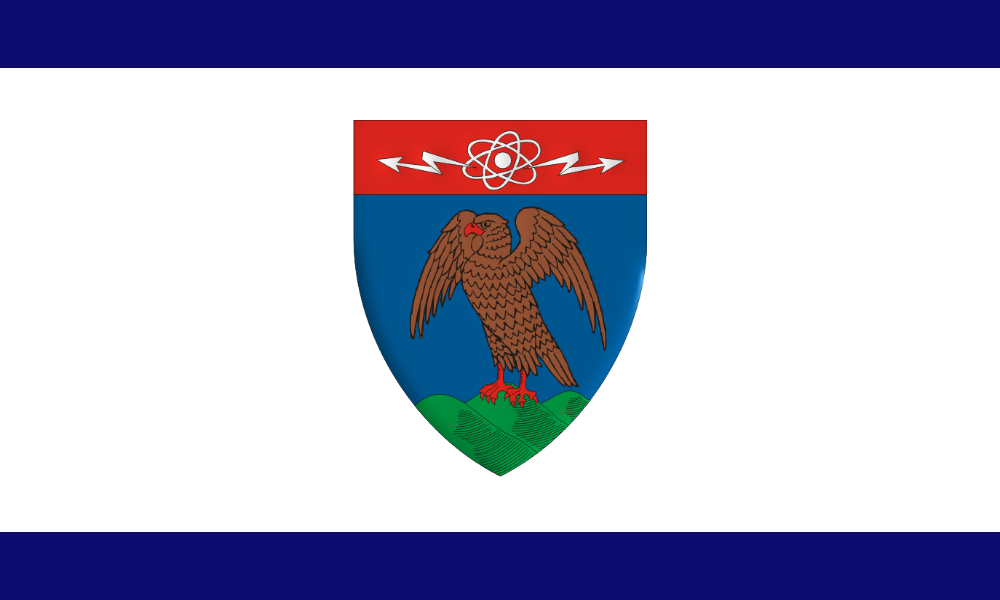
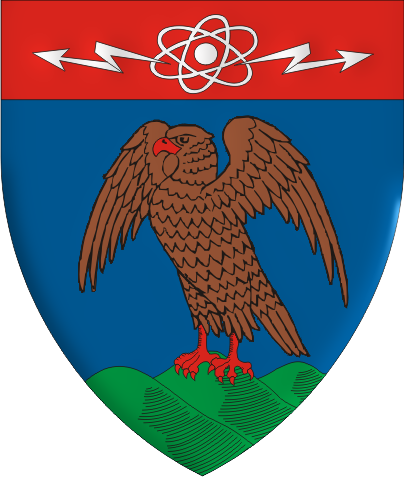
- Flag Coat of arms

- Location of Argeș County in Romania
- Coordinates: 45.0°N 24.82°E
- Country: Romania
- Development region^{1}: Sud
- Historic region: Muntenia
- County seat (Reședință de județ): Pitești

Government
  - Type: County Council
  - President of the County Council: Ion Mînzînă (PSD)
  - Prefect^{2}: Lucian-Dragoș Predrescu

Area
  - Total: 6,862 km^{2} (2,649 sq mi)
  - Rank: 10th in Romania

Population (2021-12-01)
  - Total: 569,932
  - Rank: 10th in Romania
  - Density: 83.06/km^{2} (215.1/sq mi)
- Time zone: UTC+2 (EET)
  - Summer (DST): UTC+3 (EEST)
- Postal Code: 11wxyz^{3}
- Area code: +40 x48^{4}
- ISO 3166 code: RO-AG
- Car Plates: AG^{5}
- GDP: US$4.763 billion (2015)
- GDP/per capita: US$7,780 (2015)
- Website: County Council; County Prefecture
- ^{1}The development regions of Romania have no administrative role and were formed in order to manage funds from the European Union.^{2} as of 2007, the Prefect is not a politician, but a public functionary. He (or she) is not allowed to be a member of a political party, and is banned from having any political activity in the first six months after his resignation (or exclusion) from the public functionaries' corps.^{3}w, x, y, and z are digits that indicate the city, the street, part of the street, or even the building of the address^{4}x is a digit indicating the operator: 2 for the former national operator, Romtelecom, and 3 for the other ground telephone networks^{5}used on both the plates of the vehicles that operate only in the county limits (like utility vehicles, ATVs, etc.), and the ones used outside the county

Argeș County (Romanian pronunciation: [ˈardʒeʃ]) is a county (județ) of Romania, in Muntenia, with the county seat at Pitești.

== Demographics ==
At the 2021 census, the county had a population of 569,932 and the population density was 83.1/km^{2} (215.1/sq mi). At the 2011 census, it had a population of 612,431 and the population density was 89.2/km^{2} (231.2/sq mi).

- Romanians – 97%
- Roma (Gypsies) and other ethnic groups – 3%

| Year | County population |
|---|---|
| 1948 | 448,964 |
| 1956 | 483,741 ▲ |
| 1966 | 529,833 ▲ |
| 1977 | 631,918 ▲ |
| 1992 | 680,574 ▲ |
| 2002 | 652,625 ▼ |
| 2011 | 612,431 ▼ |
| 2021 | 569,932 ▼ |

== Geography ==
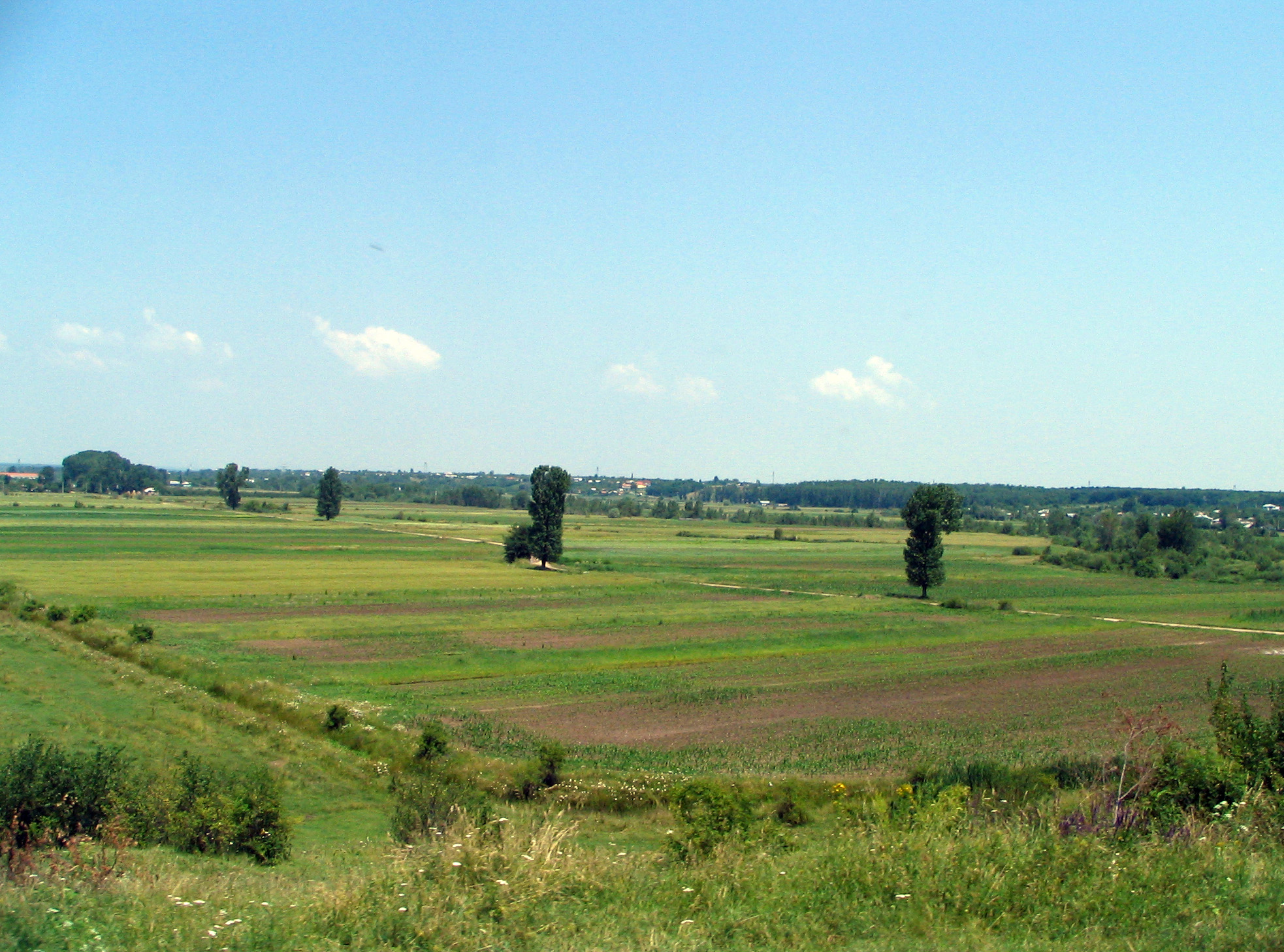
Landscape in central and southern Argeș County

This county has a total area of 6,862 km^{2} (2,649 sq mi). The landforms can be split into 3 distinctive parts. In the north side there are the mountains, from the Southern Carpathians group – the Făgăraș Mountains with Moldoveanu Peak (2,544 m), Negoiu Peak (2,535 m) and Vânătoarea lui Buteanu peak (2,508 m) towering the region, and in the North-East part the Leaotă Mountains. Between them there is a pass towards Brașov, the Rucăr–Bran Pass. The heights decrease, and in the center there are the sub-carpathian hills, with heights around 800 m (2,600 ft), crossed with very deep valleys. In the south there is the northern part of the Wallachian Plain.

The main river that crosses the county is the Argeș River in which almost all the other rivers coming from the mountains flow. In the south the main rivers are the Vedea River and the Teleorman River.

=== Neighbours ===
- Dâmbovița County in the east.
- Vâlcea County and Olt County in the west.
- Sibiu County and Brașov County in the north.
- Teleorman County in the south.

== Economy ==
The county is one of the most industrialized counties in Romania. There is one oil refinery and two automobile plants at Mioveni – the Dacia Renault car plant, and at Câmpulung the ARO plant.

The predominant industries in the county are:

- Automotive
- Chemical
- Electrical equipment
- Home appliances
- Food
- Textiles
- Construction materials

Oil is being extracted in the center and in the south. Also there are a few coal mines and close to Mioveni there is a nuclear research and production facility making nuclear fuels for the Cernavodă Nuclear Electric Power Plant. On the Argeș River there are a great number of hydroelectric power plants, the most impressive being the Vidraru power plant and dam.

The hillsides are well suited for wines and fruit orchards, and the south is suited for cereal crops.

== Tourism ==
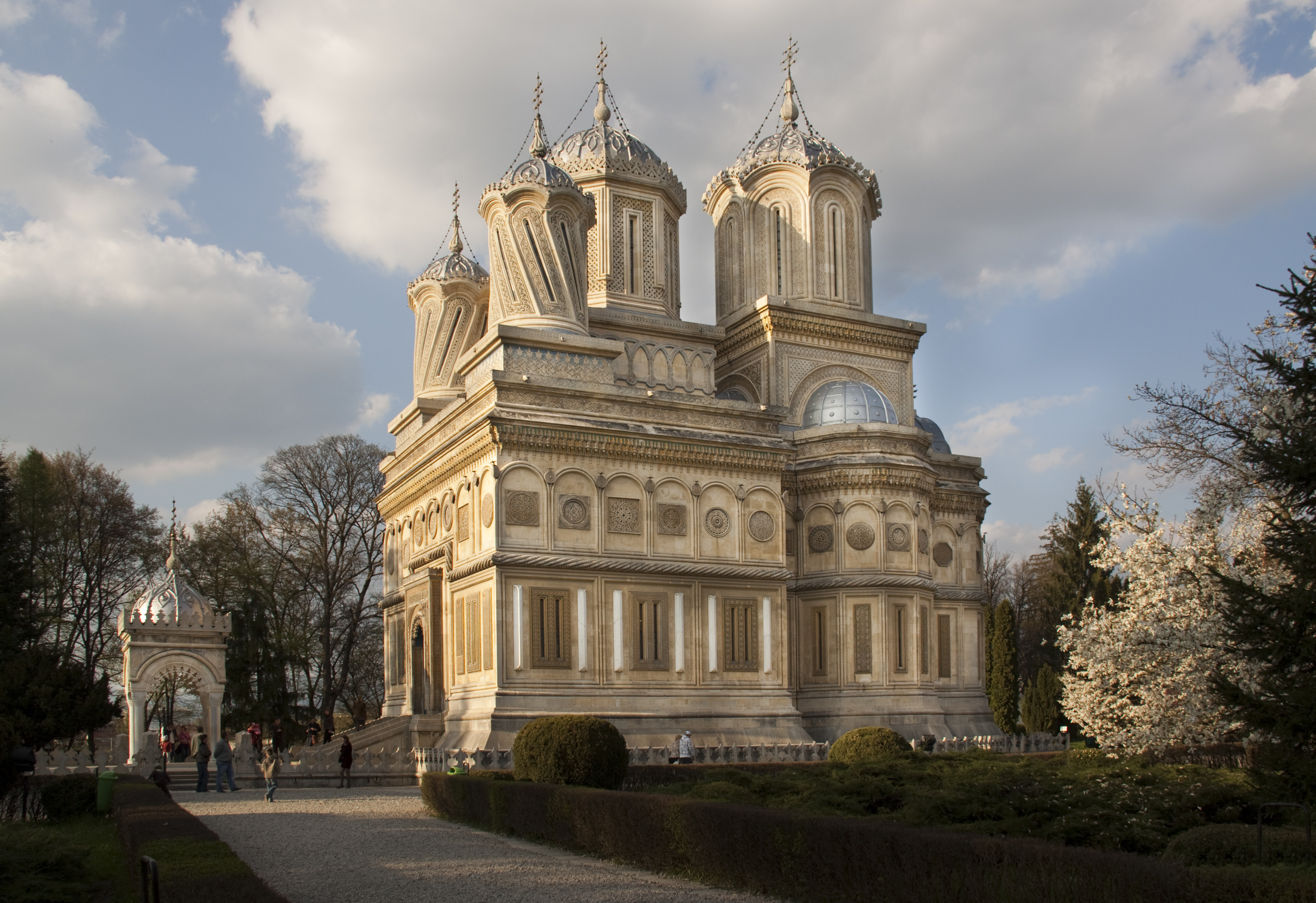
Curtea de Argeș Cathedral

The main tourist destinations are:

- The city of Pitești
- The city of Curtea de Argeș, where one of the best-known monasteries in Romania is located
- The Câmpulung – Rucăr area
- The Făgăraș Mountains – the Transfăgărășan
- The Leaota Mountains
- The Poienari Castle
- The Cotmeana monastery
- The town of Ștefănești, including Vila Florica.

== Politics ==
The Argeș County Council, renewed at the 2024 local elections, consists of 34 counselors, with the following party composition:

| Party | Seats | Current County Council |
|---|---|---|
| Social Democratic Party (PSD) | 16 | |
| National Liberal Party (PNL) | 8 | |
| United Right Alliance (ADU) | 5 | |
| Alliance for the Union of Romanians (AUR) | 5 | |

== Administrative divisions ==
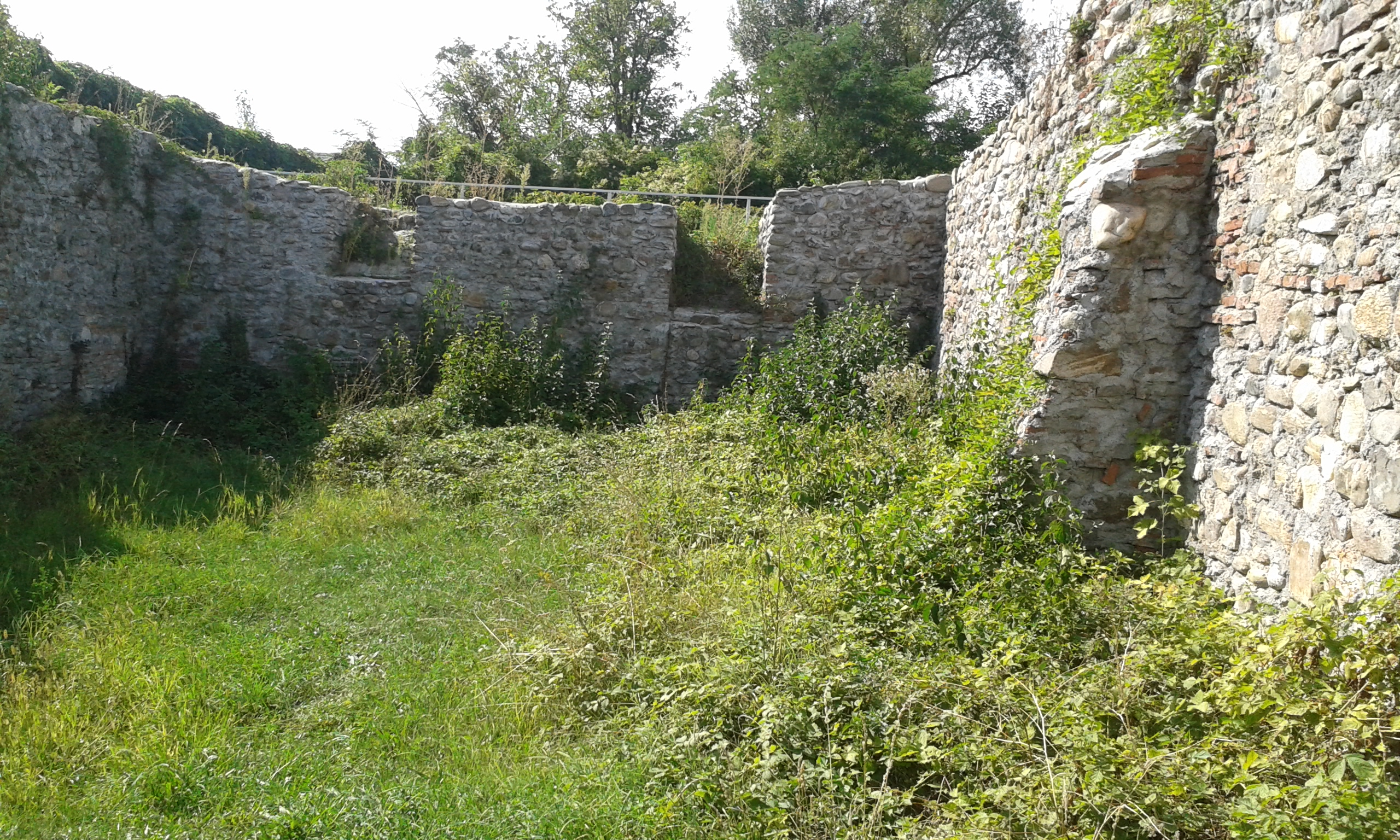
Ruins of the medieval princely court in Curtea de Argeș

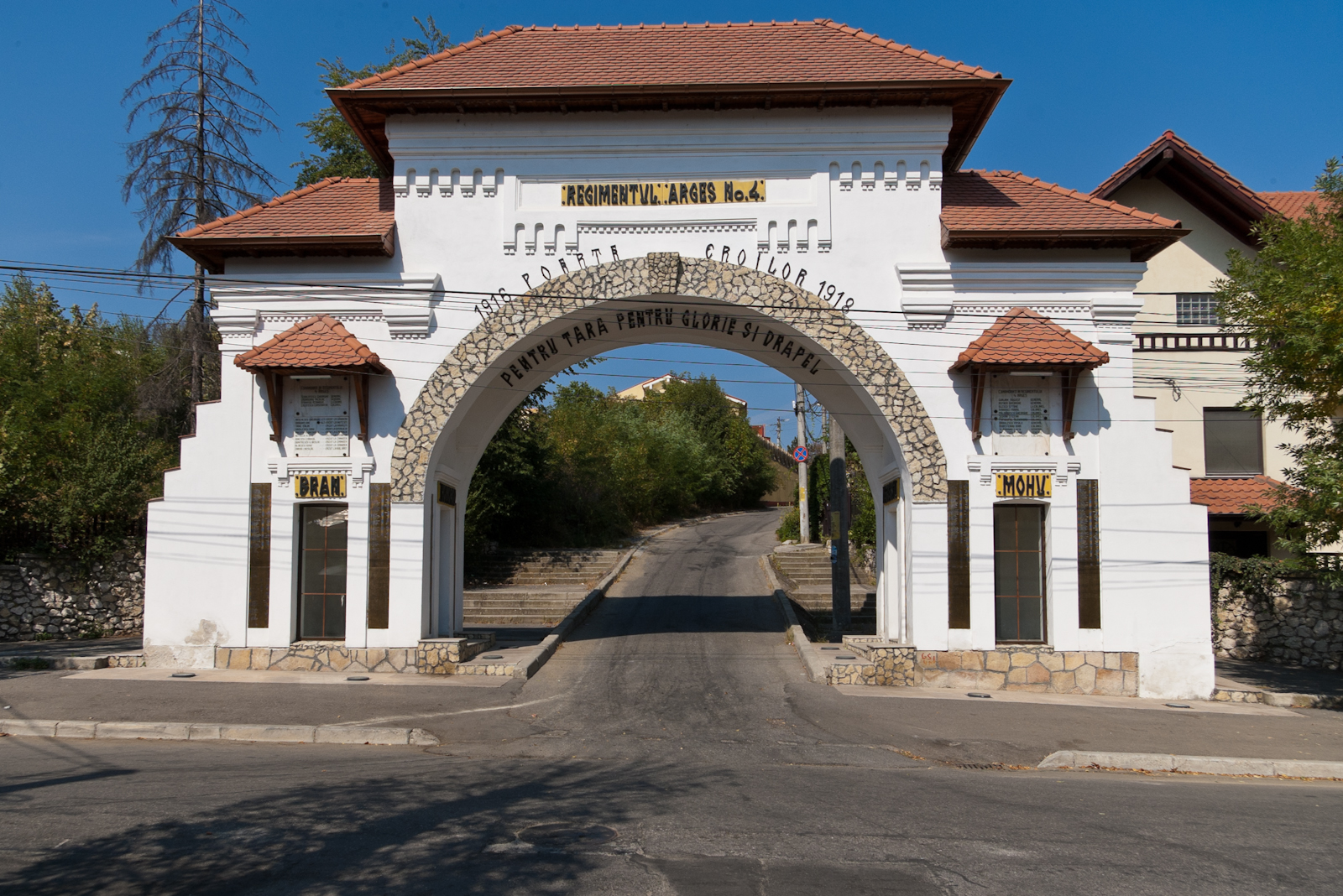
Heroes' Gate in Pitești

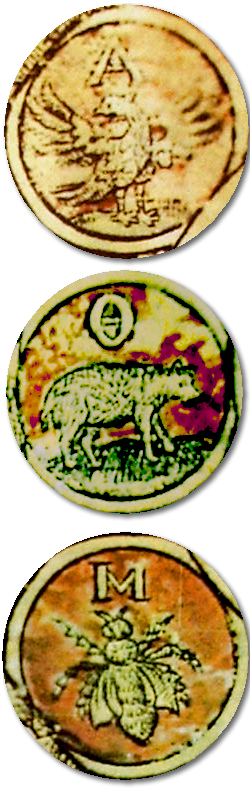
1715 coat of arms of Argeș, Teleorman and Mehedinți counties on the frontispice of the Antim Monastery

Argeș County has 3 cities, 4 towns, and 95 communes:

- Municipalities
  - Câmpulung
  - Curtea de Argeș
  - Pitești – county seat; population: 141,275 (as of 2021)
- Towns
  - Costești
  - Mioveni
  - Ștefănești
  - Topoloveni
- Communes
  - Albeștii de Argeș
  - Albeștii de Muscel
  - Albota
  - Aninoasa
  - Arefu
  - Băbana
  - Băiculești
  - Bălilești
  - Bârla
  - Bascov
  - Beleți-Negrești
  - Berevoești
  - Bogați
  - Boteni
  - Boțești
  - Bradu
  - Brăduleț
  - Budeasa
  - Bughea de Jos
  - Bughea de Sus
  - Buzoești
  - Căldăraru
  - Călinești
  - Căteasca
  - Cepari
  - Cetățeni
  - Cicănești
  - Ciofrângeni
  - Ciomăgești
  - Cocu
  - Corbeni
  - Corbi
  - Coșești
  - Cotmeana
  - Cuca
  - Dâmbovicioara
  - Dârmanești
  - Davidești
  - Dobrești
  - Domnești
  - Drăganu
  - Dragoslavele
  - Godeni
  - Hârsești
  - Hârtiești
  - Izvoru
  - Leordeni
  - Lerești
  - Lunca Corbului
  - Mălureni
  - Mărăcineni
  - Merișani
  - Micești
  - Mihăești
  - Mioarele
  - Miroși
  - Morărești
  - Moșoaia
  - Mozăceni
  - Mușătești
  - Negrași
  - Nucșoara
  - Oarja
  - Pietroșani
  - Poiana Lacului
  - Poienarii de Argeș
  - Poienarii de Muscel
  - Popești
  - Priboieni
  - Râca
  - Rătești
  - Recea
  - Rociu
  - Rucăr
  - Sălătrucu
  - Săpata
  - Schitu Golești
  - Slobozia
  - Stâlpeni
  - Ștefan cel Mare
  - Stoenești
  - Stolnici
  - Șuici
  - Suseni
  - Teiu
  - Tigveni
  - Țițești
  - Uda
  - Ungheni
  - Valea Danului
  - Valea Iașului
  - Valea Mare-Pravăț
  - Vedea
  - Vlădești
  - Vulturești

== Historical county ==
Județul Argeș
- County (Județ)
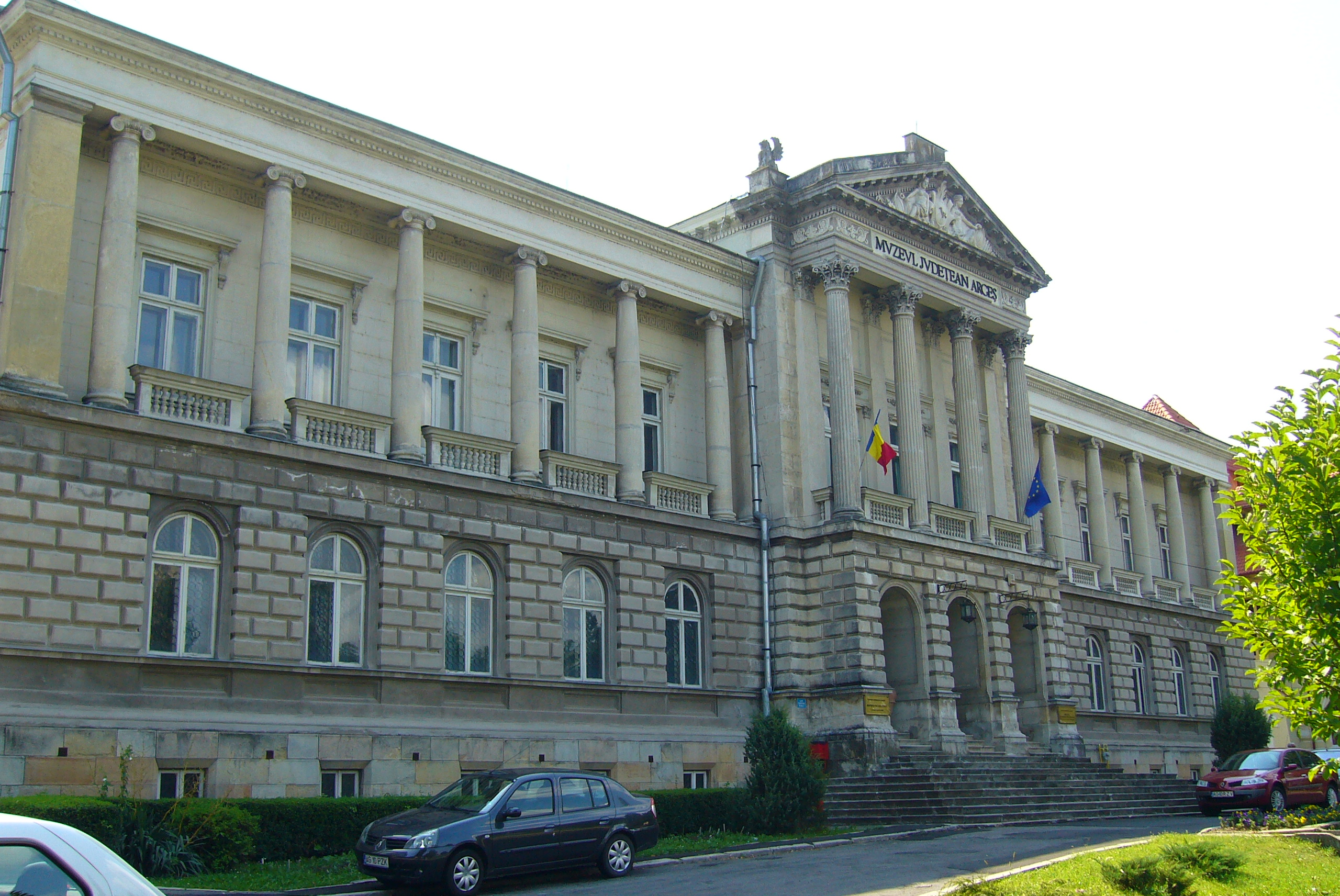
- The Argeș County Prefecture building from the interwar period, now the Argeș County museum.

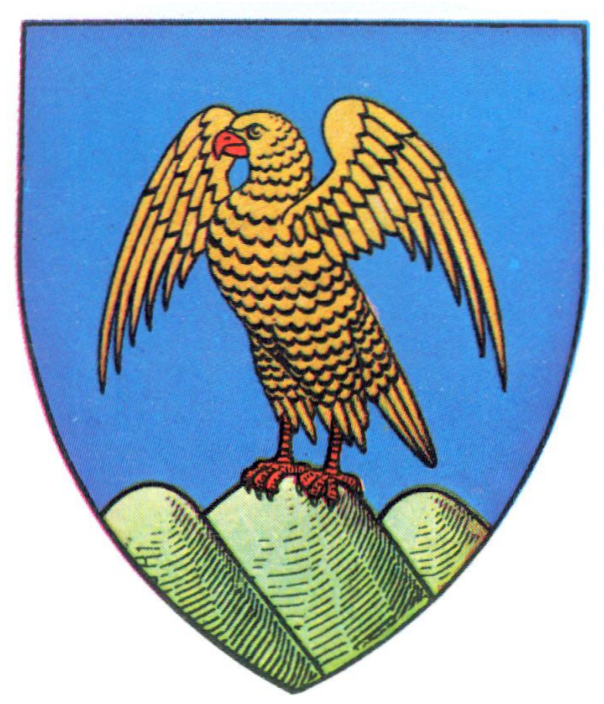
- Coat of arms

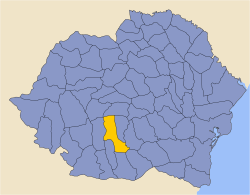
- Country: Romania
- Historic region: Muntenia
- County seat (Reședință de județ): Pitești

Area
  - Total: 4,216 km^{2} (1,628 sq mi)

Population (1930)
  - Total: 259,305
  - Density: 61.50/km^{2} (159.3/sq mi)
- Time zone: UTC+2 (EET)
  - Summer (DST): UTC+3 (EEST)

The county was located in the central-southern part of the Greater Romania, in the western part of the historic Muntenia region. Its territory comprised a large part of the current county, and a piece of the western part of the present Vâlcea County. It was bordered on the west by the counties of Olt and Vâlcea, to the north by the counties Făgăraș and Sibiu, to the east by the counties Muscel and Dâmbovița, and to the south by the counties Teleorman and Vlașca.

=== Administration ===
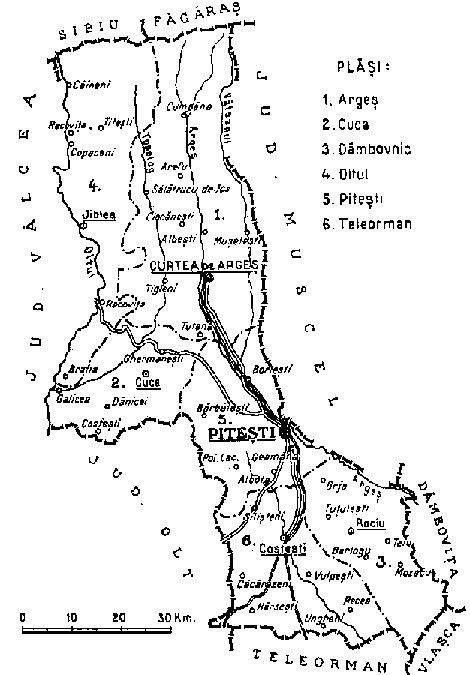
Map of Argeș County as constituted in 1938.

The county was originally (to 1925) divided administratively into five districts (plăși):

1. Plasa Argeș, headquartered at Curtea de Argeș
2. Plasa Dâmbovnic, headquartered at Rociu
3. Plasa Oltul, headquartered at Jiblea Veche
4. Plasa Teleorman, headquartered at Costești
5. Plasa Uda, headquartered at Uda

Subsequently, Plasa Uda was divided into two districts, and some territory was transferred from Plasa Oltul:

5. Plasa Cuca, headquartered at Cuca, which town was formerly in Plasa Oltul
6. Plasa Pitești, headquartered at Pitești

=== Population ===
According to the 1930 census data, the county population was 257,378 inhabitants, out of which 97.6% were ethnic Romanians. From the religious point of view, the population was 99.1% Eastern Orthodox, 0.3% Roman Catholic, 0.3% Jewish, as well as other minorities.

==== Urban population ====
In 1930, the county's urban population was 26,341 inhabitants, comprising 90.4% Romanians, 2.2% Jews, 2.0% Hungarians, 1.7% Romanies, 1.1% Germans, as well as other minorities. From the religious point of view, the urban population was composed of 93.0% Eastern Orthodox, 2.4% Roman Catholic, 2.4% Jewish, 0.7% Reformed, 0.7% Lutheran, as well as other minorities.
