= Argeșel =

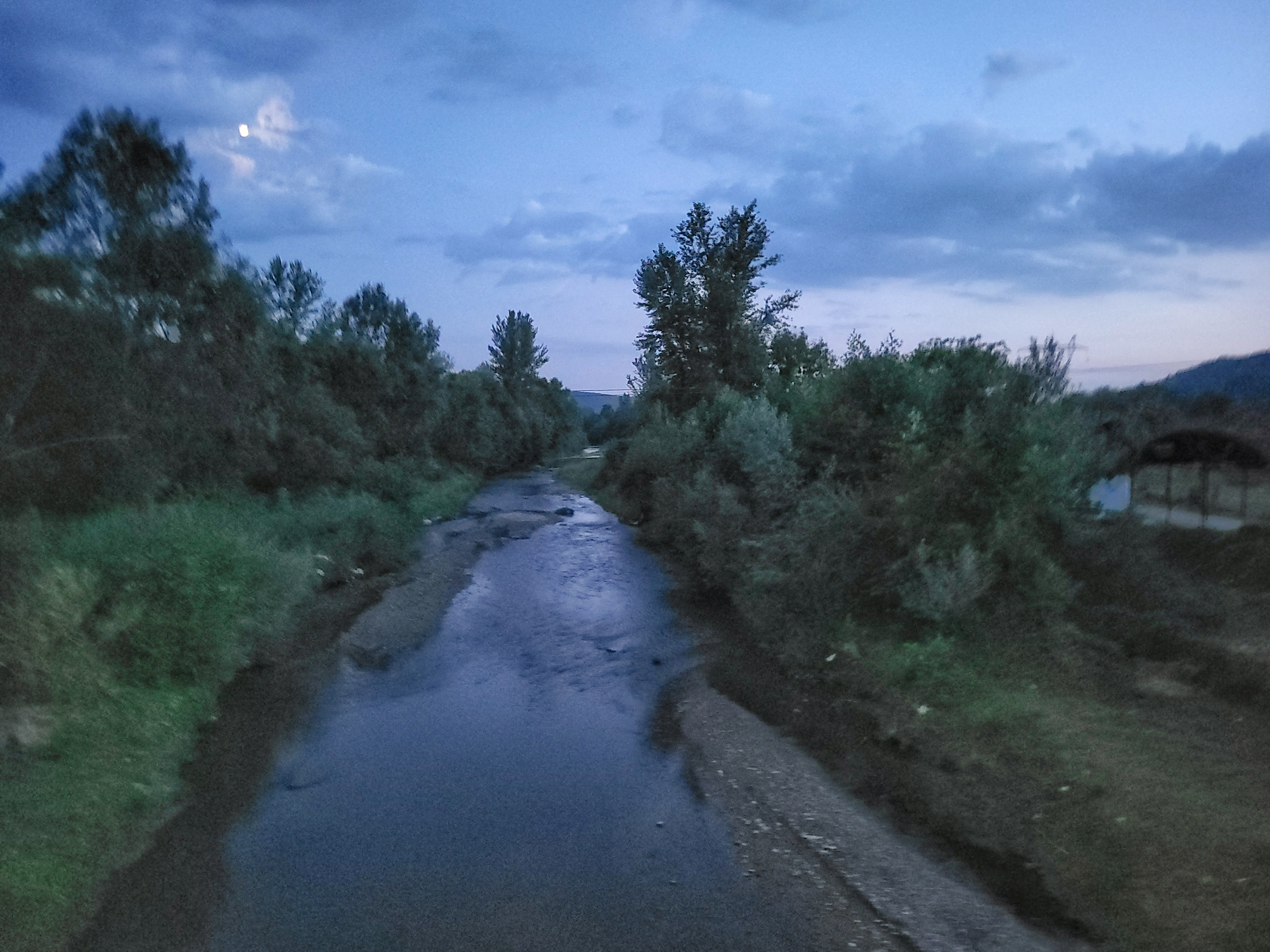

- Location within Romania

Location
- Country: Romania
- Counties: Argeș County

Physical characteristics
- Source: Iezer Mountains
- Mouth: Râul Târgului
  - location: Mioveni
  - coordinates: 44.9638°N 24.9141°E
- Length: 80 km (50 mi)
- Basin size: 242 km^{2} (93 sq mi)

Basin features
- Progression: Râul Târgului→ Râul Doamnei→ Argeș→ Danube→ Black Sea
- Tributaries
  - left: Mâzgana
  - right: Huluba

The Argeșel is a left tributary of the river Râul Târgului in Romania. Its source is near the Păpușa Peak, in the Iezer Mountains. It discharges into the Râul Târgului in Mioveni. The following towns and villages are situated along the river Argeșel, from source to mouth: Nămăești, Suslănești, Boteni, Lunca, Balabani, Lespezi, Lucieni, Hârtiești, Dealu, Vulturești, Bârzești, Voroveni, Davidești, Conțești, Racovița and Mioveni. Its length is 80 km (50 mi) and its basin size is 242 km^{2} (93 sq mi).
