= Muscel =

Muscel or Mușcel may refer to several places in Romania:

- Câmpulung, also called Câmpulung-Muscel, a city in Argeș County
- Mușcel, a village in Boteni Commune, Argeș County
- Mușcel, a village in the town of Pătârlagele, Buzău County
- Muscel, a village in Viperești Commune, Buzău County
- Mușcel, a village in Moroeni Commune, Dâmbovița County
- Muscel County, a historic county of Romania
- Mușcel (river) in Dâmbovița County
