= Mioarele =

- Commune
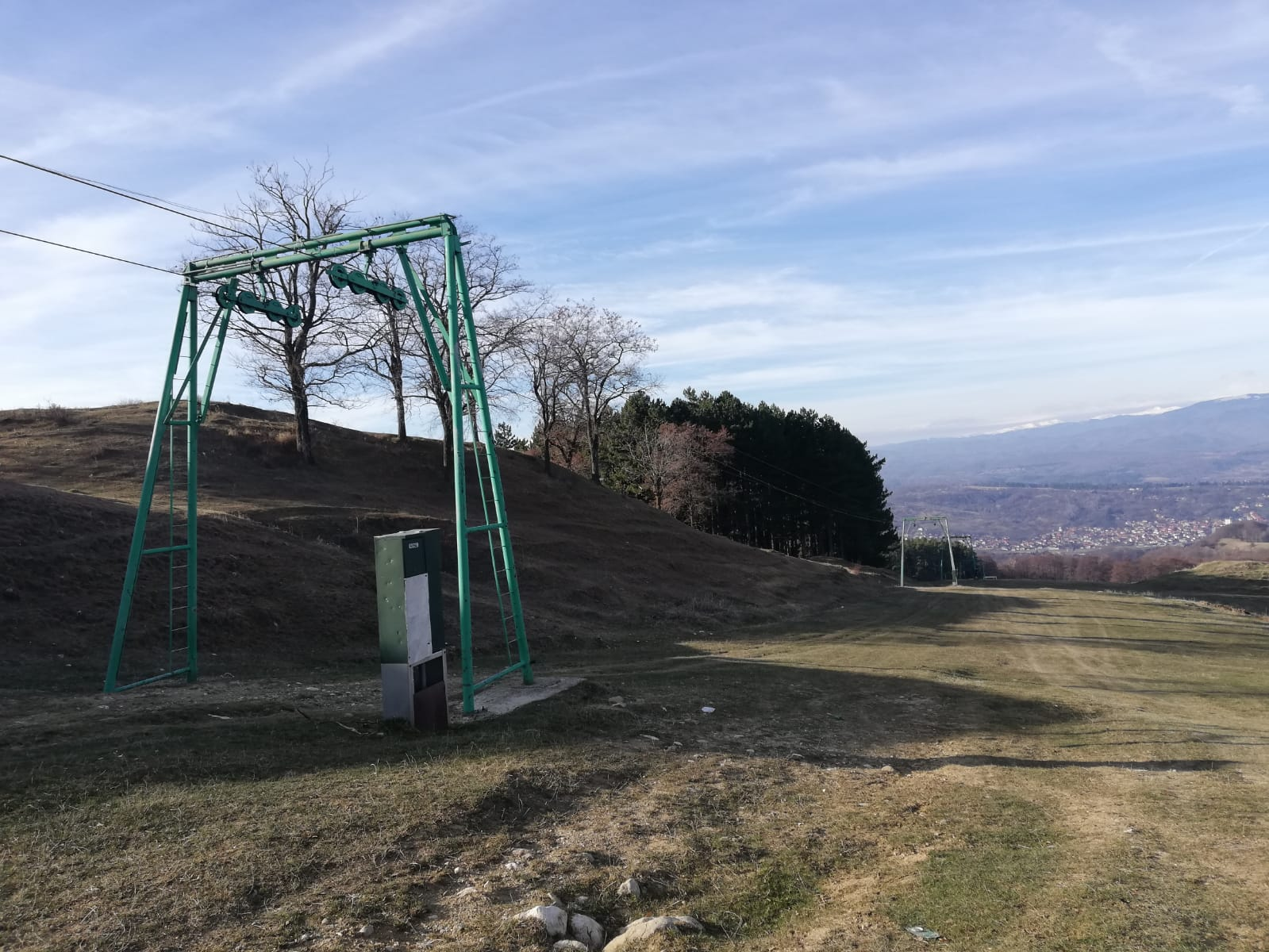
- Ski slope in Mățău-Chilii

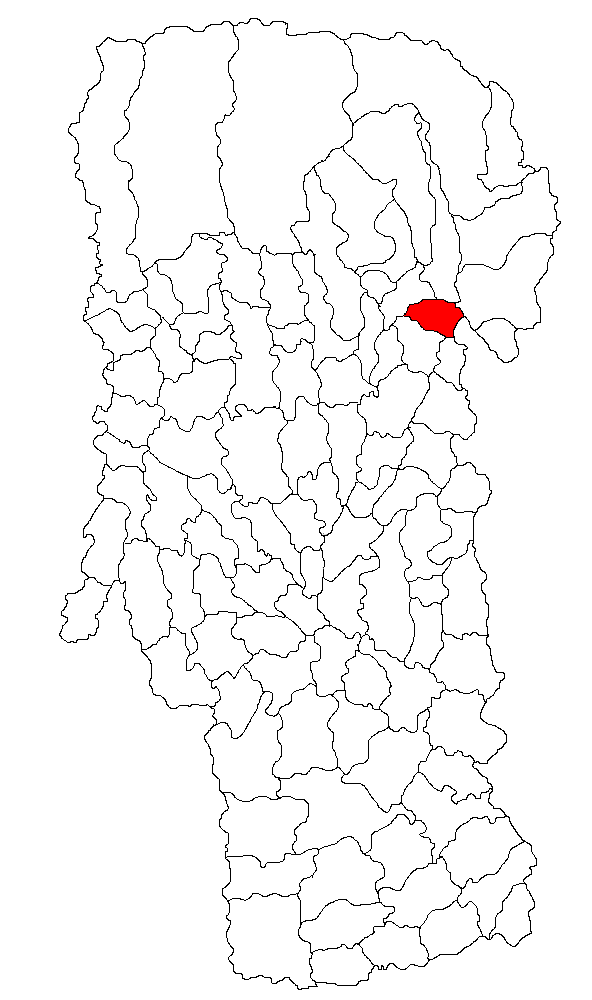
- Location in Argeș County

- Location in Romania
- Coordinates: 45°14′14″N 25°4′27″E
- Country: Romania
- County: Argeș
- First attested: 1503
- Incorporated: 1967

Government
  - Mayor (2020–2024): Gheorghe Șucu (PNL)
- Area: 33 km^{2} (13 sq mi)
- Highest elevation: 1,017 m (3,337 ft)
- Population (2021-12-01): 1,442
  - Density: 44/km^{2} (110/sq mi)
- Time zone: UTC+02:00 (EET)
  - Summer (DST): UTC+03:00 (EEST)
- Postal code: 117480-117484, 117486
- Vehicle reg.: AG
- Website: www.cjarges.ro/en/web/mioarele

Mioarele, formerly known as Mățău, is a commune in Argeș County, Muntenia, Romania. Located 4 kilometers southeast of Câmpulung, on the way to Târgoviște, it touches both the Argeș River valley and the banks of its Argeșel tributary. It is composed of five villages: Mățău (the commune center), with Chilii and Cocenești, as one cluster; Suslănești, the oldest surviving village, is located farther to the east, alongside Aluniș. The commune, like Câmpulung itself, sits just below the Southern Carpathians, and includes Mățău peak, held as the tallest hill in Romania, as well as sediments with fossilized fish from the Oligocene period. Mățău and especially Suslănești are traditional centers for horticulture, as well as for the related plum-brandy industry.

The area engaged in commerce since Antiquity, when it was used as a trading post by the Dacians. Its history remained obscure during the early medieval interlude, and down to the foundation of an early Romanian polity, though archeological finds suggest that the defunct village of Hobaia, located on commune grounds, was inhabited as early as the 10th century AD. Toponymic clues have led historians to suppose that Mioarele's inhabitants included Early Slavs and Cumans, and that some part of the village may be known in written records from 1401 or 1402. A component of Muscel County in Wallachia, Suslănești was first mentioned in 1503, due to its participation in trade with the Transylvanian Saxons; it and Hobaia were inhabited by yeomen—some of whom advanced into Muscel's boyardom, while others became their serfs, and then their sharecroppers. While Hobaia was destroyed in mysterious circumstances, a dominant clan, the Jumăreas, emerged at Suslănești during the 17th century. The Jumărea ascendancy coincided with a regional migration, at the end of which Mățău was established as a secondary hamlet.

This new settlement thrived while Suslănești went into a relative decline, its land encroached upon by several monastery estates and boyar families—including the Rucăreanus, who had a long feud with the Jumăreas and the other remaining yeomen. Large property was consolidated under the Kingdom of Romania, down to a land reform in 1944. Present-day Mioarele was noted as a scene of heavy fighting during the Romanian withdrawal in World War I, and was vandalized by the Central Powers during a two-year occupation (1916–1918). It emerged from the war as a hub of agrarian politics and an electoral pool for the National Peasants' Party. The decline of the peasant class was curtailed when locals were encouraged to cultivate themselves and advance socially, including by migrating into other areas of the country. Driven by schoolteachers such as Ion Vișoianu and Ion Gh. Nicolaescu-Mățău, this effort made Mățău and Suslănești stand out as the ancestral homeland for a large number of cultural and political notabilities; figures who trace their origin to the area include Muscel's Prefect Alexandru Mușetescu, literary scholar Dan Simonescu, and writer Tudor Mușatescu.

The education-driven institutional modernization was doubled from the 1940s by attempts to introduce intensive horticulture and improve transportation. Such objectives were realized by the communist regime, which incorporated the villages under a single commune in 1956–1967, and made it part of Argeș County in 1968; it also introduced the collectivization of farmlands, with a large-scale cultivation of orchards, and conscripted local youth in projects of road modernization. During its late stages, the regime completed the national road 73, which goes around Mioarele. After the Romanian Revolution of 1989, the commune remained underdeveloped due to water deficiencies, though it also completed Argeș's first-ever ski slope, in 2007.

== Geography ==
Mioarele is noted for its pastures and Prunus domestica orchards, being locally famous for the "white plums of Suslănești" (prune albe de Suslănești). As of 2023, its surface area is 33 square kilometers; it borders Câmpulung to the south and west, Stoenești to the east, Boteni to the south, Poienari to the south and west, Bilcești, a part of Valea Mare-Pravăț, also to the west. In addition to being located on the Argeș, the commune also straddles the border between the Argeș Hills (called muscele) and the Southern Carpathians; these are reported to include oil sands that reflect their geological origin in the Oligocene and Tethys Ocean.

With a height of 1,017 meters, Mățău Hill is rated as the tallest hill in all of Romania. The eponymous village, central to Mioarele, sits atop this hill, overlooking the corresponding Câmpulung Depression, and spreads over several kilometers. Another one of the hills is Hobaia (or Marlauz) in Suslănești, which has a large trove of fossilized Oligocene fish, and is maintained as a scientific reserve. The locality is also close to Mateiaș Hill, and has direct views over three Carpathian ranges: Piatra Craiului, Iezer, and Făgăraș.

== History ==
=== Early history ===
In a 1961 piece, local historian Nicolae Nasta summarized the results of archeological finds in and around Suslănești, reporting that, during Dacian rule in the 3rd century BC, the area served as a storage spot for wine and oil, imported from the Greek cities on the Black Sea coast. According to a news item of 2022, Mățău Hill was still hosting a yearly ceremony called "Sumedru's Fire", which may be of a pre-Christian origin. The peak's name is the subject of scholarly dispute, with theories indicating very different origins. The favored explanation is that it comes from the Early Slavs, and that it originally meant "bear's village" (it may also refer to the locals' physical built, since, as a common noun, it is used to mean "wide-shouldered man"); others see it as originating from a Modern Greek term for "nipple", in reference to the hill's general shape. Historian Ștefan Pascu proposes yet another origin, from the Bulgarian Мацо (Matso), a pet form of "Matthew".

The digs at Hobaia, a village that once existed just east of Suslănești's territory, were also said to have uncovered ruins dating back to the 10th century AD. Local historian Ion Nania argues that, during the Early Middle Ages in Romania, Mățău-Mioarele was an area of Cuman settlement, and as such briefly included in the Roman Catholic Diocese of Cumania. He uses as evidence historical sources which discuss a rump "Cumania" as being located east of the Olt River, as well seemingly Cumanic place-names, such as "Marlauz" in Suslănești. Suslănești, which may have been originally known as "Negurești" or "Neguțești", is the only locality in Romania to use this name. Of uncertain origin, it may stem from a Slavic term, соуслъ (rendered in Romanian as suslă)—referring to a byproduct of distillation in the process of making plum brandy; a competing theory sees it as a contraction of sus la lână ("up there with the wool"), suggesting ancient origins as a sheep-shearing station. Such theories are disputed by some linguists, who note that the suffix -ănești is almost always indicative of a name derived form anthroponymy. They suggest that the place was named for Suslea, from the Slavic name Suslo(v).

Mățău and its environs entered recorded history as a settlement in what was then Muscel County, part of the Romanian polity known as Wallachia. One document, dated 1401 or 1402, mentions Ohaba (literally: "fiscal immunity") on the Argeșel, a name which may have been transformed into Hobaia ("ravine"), and is perhaps the oldest mention of any part of the present-day commune. An indirect report that a village existed in Mățău during the mid-to-late 15th century is provided by the mention of two locals serving as soldiers for Wallachian Prince Vlad the Impaler. Suslănești and the surrounding areas were located on the border with Angevin Hungary, and engaged in trade with its Transylvanian Saxons. In 1503, the commercial register of Corona mentioned the village (called Suslanest or Suschlanest in Saxon dialect) as one of 28 Wallachian localities it had direct and permanent exchanges with. This marks the first attestation of the locality; the 1503 record also specifically mentions locals Buda and Tudor bringing wels, beeswax and hides to the markets in Corona. Some time after, in July 1512, a village known as Negomirești, probably baptized after its founder Negomir, was also attested near Mățău Hill.

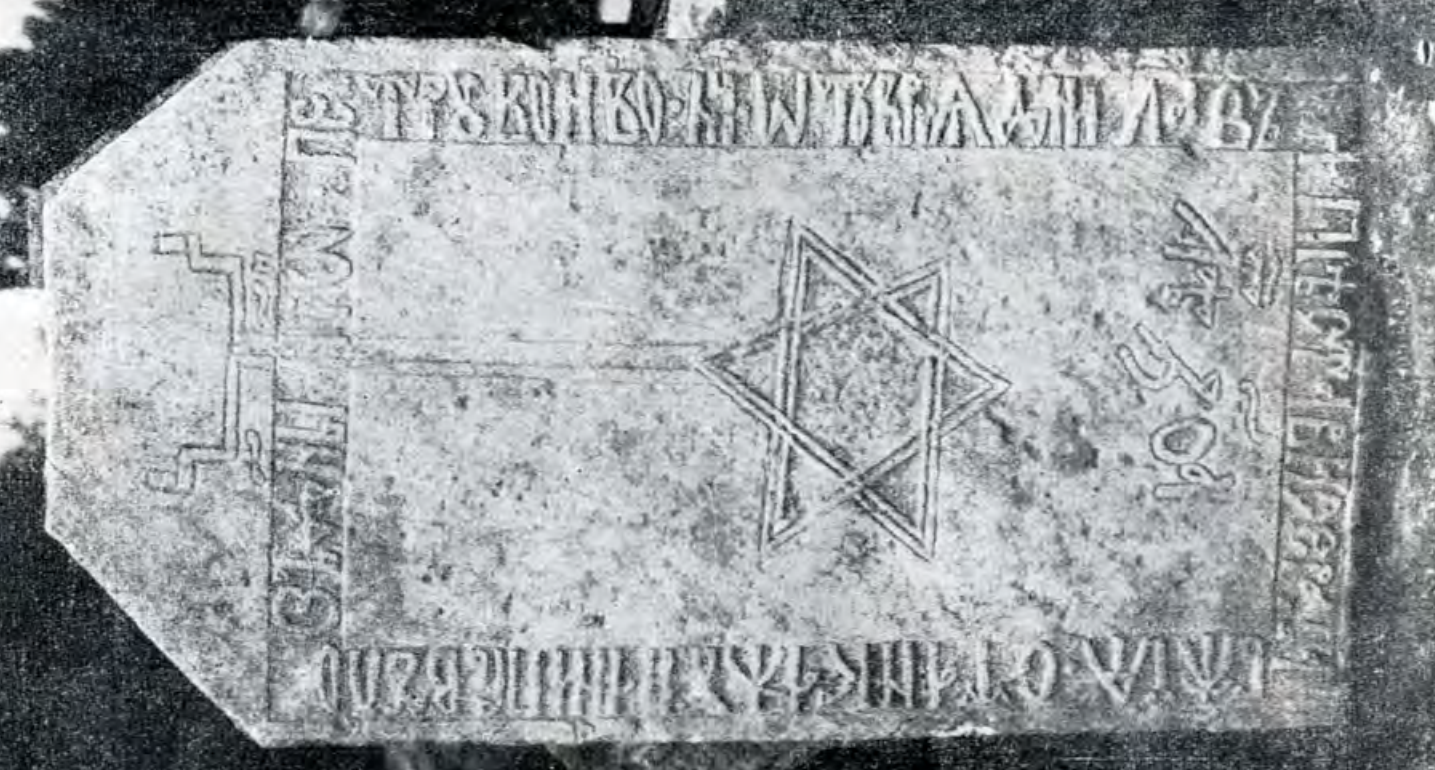
Boyaress Stanca's gravestone, dated to 1562, at the church in Suslănești

The future commune was originally divided into yeomen (moșneni) and serfs (clăcași)—the former owned the entire future commune, roughly divided into five plots. According to sociological research carried out by Ioan Șucu in the 1970s, the yeomen lineages are traceable to medieval times, whereas the serf families are historically invisible to 1746, when Prince Constantine Mavrocordatos abolished serfdom, and lifted them into the class of sharecroppers. Traces of Hobaia were rediscovered by accident in July 1939, along with the ruins of a Wallachian Orthodox church, with four tombs from the mid-16th century. The church was positively dated to the early 16th century, while the bodies buried were tentatively identified as belonging to the lowest caste of the boyar aristocracy, "since nothing is mentioned of their ranks." The spot was re-investigated by archeologists in July 1959. They discovered 19 tombs, dating from the 15th and 16th centuries, and valuable artifacts. These include a ring belonging to Spatharios Cazan, indicative of a much higher boyar ranking and decorated with the double-headed eagle.

=== Jumărea ascendancy ===
The church building and surrounding Hobaia were ransacked and burned down at some unknown time in history (possibly by the Ottoman Army). One reading suggest that they were destroyed in 1595, when Prince Michael the Brave had involved Wallachia in the Long Turkish War. The surrounding areas were inhabited over the following decades: documents from the 1570s and '80s mention several yeomen (Radu, Drăghici, Oprea of Suslănești) acting as witnesses in land disputes and other legal matters; between the 1590s and the 1620s, the village was one of several estates owned by the boyar Staicu, who rose to the rank of Postelnic. A votive cross in Church Slavonic, dating from the 1650s, mentions Suslănești locals Vladislav, Șerban, Negre and Pârvu. In December 1656, Prince Constantin Șerban granted parts of Suslănești to Ceauș Lunea, who had previously been engaged in a legal battle for its ownership.

Court documents make numerous references to an increasingly powerful Muscel family. Known as "Jumărea" or "Jumărescu", its first known member was Voicu Toacă of Suslănești (active before 1644), whose inheritance was split between children Badea, Neaga, Vișa and Neacșa (the former is known to have used a double-headed eagle on his own seal). From 1697, their estates were also encroached upon by Câmpulung Monastery, after the local Hieromonk, Cozma, issued a donation. In April 1707, the seven sons of Stanciu Jumărea claimed ownership of Suslănești in its entirety, and met to delineate its southern borders. Voicu's properties continued to be disputed between their various successors, down to 1824. Suslănești became a fief of the Filipescu boyars in the late 17th or early 18th century, granted to them by Prince Constantin Brâncoveanu. Into the 19th century, the land was fragmented further, with plots donated to Șubești Church of Câmpulung, or purchased by the Skete of Mărculești, by Alecu Chilișoiu, and by Logothete Nicolae Rucăreanu. The latter, while feuding with the Jumăreas and exploiting the sharecroppers, obtained recognition as Lunea's heir.

Around 1550, Mățău was slowly being reestablished as a village separate from Suslănești. A princely writ by Mircea Ciobanul, dated 1558 or 1559, mentions a merchant Dumitru of Mățău, who had been wronged by Saxon authorities. The name as used for a locality is again attested in June 1614, as Mățăul de Jos ("Lower Mățău"), with the upper half of the village implied, but only truly mentioned in April 1716. Mățăul de Jos was later abandoned, and its memory is preserved in local toponymy as Căminuri ("Hearths"). In the 1920s, journalist Gheorghe Lungulescu argued that the settlement had been peopled by soldiers in Michael the Brave's armies, and that some of the surrounding estates went to Michael's generals, the Buzești brothers. Other records suggest that most of Mățău's inhabitants, including the Vișoiu family, had moved out of the Jumărea domains; it incorporated Negomirești, which disappeared from public record after 1784. Another secondary hamlet, Dănești, was first attested under that name in 1600, but, after become the identifiable home of a large clan, the Coceans, changed its name to "Cocenești". The newer village, Chilii, was mentioned beginning in 1708. One other group of locals moved out of the area and into Câmpulung, adopting the surname "Suslănescu". Branches of this clan were attested as far east as Ploiești.

By the 18th century, all land in present-day Mioarele was included in one of Muscel's standard subdivisions, or plăși (singular: plasă). This particular one was named after the Argeșel, and had eleven villages in all—also including Cetățeni and Valea Mare-Pravăț. Muscel's social composition was revealed in July 1774: upon the end of war in Eastern Europe, Wallachia was briefly occupied by the Russian Empire, and a Russian official by the name of Tsurikov was tasked with conducting a fiscal census. It records 62 households of scutelnici (who did not owe any tax), and notes that they still owned the village land. These families preserved their status beyond that moment, and until 1835. Tsurikov also records three priests and five deacons living in Mățău's fiscal jurisdiction. Only a small wooden church, built in the early 19th century by Postelnic Simon Jumărescu, was servicing the Orthodox parishioners in Suslănești. In December 1848, a stone building was completed with funds from the new Postelnic, Ioan Simon Jumărescu (Simon's son), his wife Ana Popeasca, and his sister Cocoana Eleana. During the mid-19th century, Mățău was threatened with devastation by a local brigand, Radu Anghel. One local legend is that he was ultimately persuaded into disengaging by a local peasant, Simon of Suslănești; contrarily, a folk song records Anghel's attack on Ioan Simon.

=== Modernization era ===
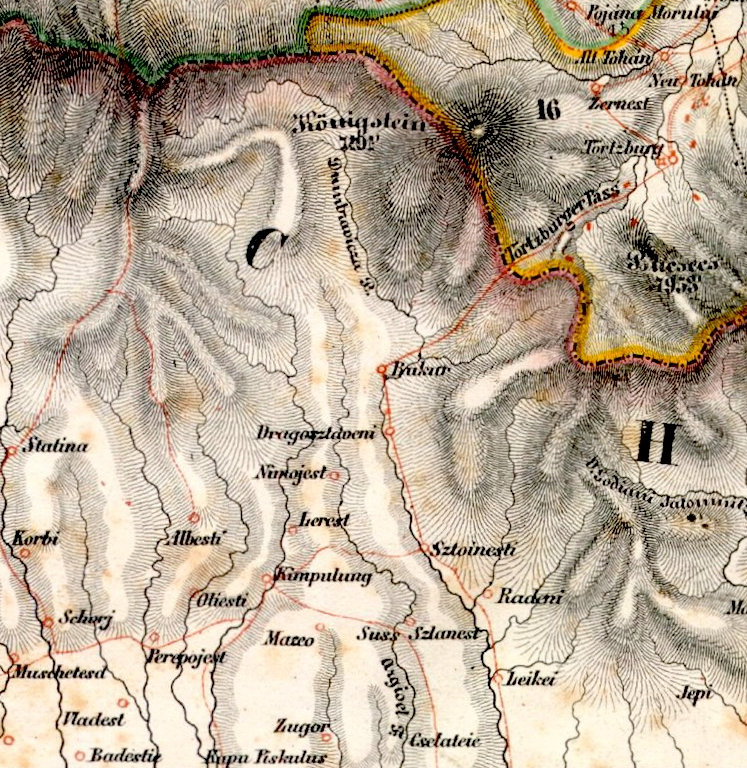
Detail of a German-language map of 1862: Rucăr–Bran (Törzburger) Pass on what was then the border between the Austrian Empire and the United Principalities (Wallachia), showing the northern areas of Muscel County (around Câmpulung). With Mățău (Mazeo) and Suslănești (Suss Szlanest) as separate villages

The subsequent decades saw Wallachia merged into the United Principalities (from 1859), followed by the consolidated Kingdom of Romania (from 1881). In 1893, Mățău commune had incorporated Suslănești, as well as Chiliile, Cocenești, and Călulești—the latter village has since been fully absorbed into Mățău village; not yet mentioned as a separate village, Aluniș appeared in public records as a Mățău land grant. The Kingdom increased the pace of institutional modernization; in the 1890s, its Education Minister, Spiru Haret, directed Muscel's teaching staff to provide for the peasants' cultivation and social emancipation. As a result, Mățău had a school library (rural Muscel's second-largest in 1902), and from 1901 a students' cafeteria. The local school, whose main teacher was Ion Vișoianu, was successful in promoting social advancement. In a September 1930 article prompted by the alumni reunion, novelist Cezar Petrescu argued that they included "three physicians, six secondary-school professors, four magistrates, seven officers, one veterinarian, three lawyers, eleven priests, thirty-six primary-school teachers, [and] two high-ranking clerks in the ministry of finance". A similar influence was exercised by Nicolae Cristescu, a Mățău native who taught at the school in Goleștii Badii, Topoloveni; his students included Ion Mihalache, the future agrarian politician, and Mihai Antonescu, Deputy Premier during World War II.

Muscel became a theater of war shortly after Romania entered World War I, when the country was invaded by the Central Powers. The scene of several aerial dogfights and repeated shelling, Mățău was also a destination for the refugee citizens of Câmpulung, and eventually occupied by the Central Powers during the massive defeats of late 1916. The villages were taken by the Bavarian Army's 12th Infantry Division, after heavy fighting, on November 30. The Romanian Land Forces' withdrawal reportedly saw Mihalache, who was serving with the rank of Captain, rescuing a trove of documents and monies out of Suslănești. Over the next two years, the occupiers ransacked Suslănești, including by cutting down centennial walnut trees, which had been planted by the Jumăreas. Many natives of the commune continued to fight for Romania after the withdrawal into Western Moldavia (to 1918), and then in the Hungarian–Romanian War (1919). Their sacrifice was commemorated by the authorities of Greater Romania in 1922, when a war monument, done by sculptor Dumitru Mățăoanu, was unveiled in Mățău.

The Rucăreanus liquidated their assets in Suslănești during the early 20th century, selling their estate the Prislopeanu family, whose female descendant, married Andreescu, held on to it until 1944; similarly, the Jumărescus sold their land to Ioniță Georgescu—the resulting two estates had 100 hectares between them, while yeomen descendants had fallen into destitution. Meanwhile, Simon of Suslănești had become patriarch of the Simon (later Simonescu) clan. His grandsons include Dan Simonescu, a Romanian literary historian and bibliographer, and Colonel Constantin Simonescu, killed in action on the Eastern Front of World War II. The former, born in 1902, recalls spending his childhood "among the peasants of Suslănești", "with a sort of liberty that was rarely impinged upon by pedagogic principles." In the 1920s, he took folklorist Constantin Rădulescu-Codin on a visit to Mioarele area. Mățău was traditionally upheld as the birthplace of comedic writer Tudor Mușatescu (born 1903), but this was dismissed in 2003 by Mușatescu's son; he notes that only some members of the family lived in the village, while Tudor and his parents had settled in Câmpulung.

The interwar political scene brought new forces on the political scene, including Mihalache's Muscel-based Peasants' Party. Its core membership included schoolteacher Gheorghe Vișoiu, originally from Mățău, though his political career only peaked after he moved to Olt County. The movement for social and cultural uplift was continued locally by schoolteacher Ion Gh. Nicolaescu (known as Nicolaescu-Mățău), who, together with other village intellectuals, founded the magazine Muscelul Nostru, put out from Câmpulung in 1929–1942. Following general elections in December 1928, Mihalache's new National Peasants' Party (PNȚ) took power in Romania, including control of the Prefectures. The office of Prefect in Muscel County went to Alexandru Mușetescu, a Mățău native. During his tenure, he was criticized for not drilling into the hill to provide Câmpulung with a new source of water, since the existing sources were contaminated by lime.

In 1930, under decentralizing laws favored by the PNȚ, "Pravăț" was established as a separate commune, with mayors retained for each of the eleven villages absorbed into it. This structure grouped Suslănești, Mățău, Surbănești (formerly part of Mățău), and Valea Mare, as well as villages in present-day Lerești and Stoenești. Under this regime, Mățău built a new communal stable, a cattle market, and several gravel roads (one of which led to Jugur). In January 1933, a bobsleigh competition was held on Mățău Hill, for the "Machelaru Cup". The administrative situation was reversed by later governments: Suslănești was administered as a separate commune, and remained a regional center of the PNȚ. This was reported by Dreptatea newspaper during the local elections of Muscel in June 1936; the same newspaper also claimed that, in order to win a majority of votes, the National Liberals threatened locals that, should they vote Peasantist, the commune would be disestablished by order of the Prefect. In September of that year, the PNȚ study circle in Câmpulung invited doctrinaire Mihai Ralea to lecture for the peasants of Suslănești and Lerești.

=== World War II and after ===
From 1939, Romania was a single-party state, ruled upon by King Carol II and his National Renaissance Front (FRN). In the political and administrative reorganization which followed, Mățău and Suslănești were separate communes, both included in a new plasă, named after Radu Negru. In December 1939, their respective FRN secretaries were Gh. I. Vișoianu and Nae D. Vlădău. Muscel had been merged into the larger regional unit, Ținutul Bucegi, whose Royal Resident, Gheorghe Alexianu, set himself the goal of building a new bridge on the highway linking Mățău to Boteni. Around the same time, the Romanian Social Service, the regime's organization for charity work, established a "command center" in Mățău, which also had its own village team, under Commandant Cecilia Spirescu.

Câmpulung and its immediate surroundings were affected by an earthquake in January 1940. Its causes were unknown at the time, but one theory suggested shifts within the Mățău Hill bedrock. Heavy rainfall that July reportedly caused a major landslide in Suslănești, with "enormous panic and frantic flight of the population." Months later, the downfall of the FRN regime and its replacement with Ion Antonescu's dictatorship also brought a reestablishment of the counties, with military or civilian commissioners as their Prefects. In May 1942, Antonescu's appointment in Muscel, General Teodor Nicolau, announced that he intended to develop Mățău, Suslănești and Boteni into a hub of intensive horticulture. Suslănești was again merged into Mățău commune; its other census-designated places of 1941 were Călulești, Cocenești, and Melcești (the latter name disappeared from public memory in later decades). The final stages of World War II saw the United States Air Force bombing southern Romania; on May 5–6, 1944, this mission focused on Pitești. In the resulting dogfights with the Royal Romanian Air Force, three American bombers were downed over Suslănești, which was at the time still a separate commune.

During the communist period, Muscel was merged into the Argeș Region. Mățău and Suslănești were merged by government order in 1956, despite some local opposition. This reticence pushed the authorities to select a new name, "Mioarele" (from mioare, "young sheep", alluding to the region's background in animal husbandry). Aluniș was attached to the commune only in 1967. From 1968, the Region was divided into smaller counties; Muscel was not reestablished, but fused with Argeș County. As part of this arrangement, the present-day commune was described as centered on Mățău. Aluniș, Chilii, Cocenești and Suslănești were the subordinate villages. In December 1958, the paving of roads linking Mățău and Câmpulung was assigned to volunteers from the Workers' Youth, including from the village branch.

After being the recipients of a land reform in late 1944, which liquidated the Georgescu and Andreescu estates, the peasants of Mioarele were included in the collectivization of farmlands. By 1972, the state agricultural enterprise of Câmpulung was running two collective farms on commune grounds: one called "Mioarele", which focused on animal husbandry, and one called "Suslănești", which was primarily an orchard. The latter formed part of a state program to encourage the reclamation of unused land for tree cultivation; the "Argeș Tree Reservoir", established in the 1960s, included the commune, alongside areas of Valea Mare, Lerești, and Rucăr. By 1977, Mioarele was also home to a Centrocoop supermarket and consumers' cooperative. A poets' society named after Mușatescu was established in the commune in October 1975, and recruited in its ranks "some 25 members [...] aged 15 to 76"; it put out anthologies of its work in 1977 and 1989. The archeological digs, meanwhile, were continued and enhanced by Flaminu Mîrțu, director of the Câmpulung Museum.

During early 1987, the national road 73 (DN73), linking Câmpulung to both Brașov and Râmnicu Vâlcea, was fully modernized. Mioarele was mentioned in the news after the Romanian Revolution of 1989—in September 2005, the portion of DN73 linking it to Mioveni was damaged by massive floods. In March of the following year, the road was blocked by picketers from the ARO factory in Câmpulung, who had not received their salaries for months after privatization. In 2007, investors Dorin Mirea and Gabriel Marcu inaugurated the only ski slope of Argeș, located at Mățău-Chilii. In the early 2020s, Gheorghe Șucu went public with complaints that the commune was not realizing its potential in tourism on account of having no running water. As he explained in 2021, wells had been drilled, but no water could be located into the bedrock. Also that year, the ski slope's seasonal opening was postponed after the snow groomer was discovered to be unusable, allegedly due to theft of its parts.
