= Huluba =

Huluba may refer to the following places in Romania:

- Huluba (Argeșel), a tributary of the Argeșel in Argeș County
- Huluba, a tributary of the Râușor in Argeș County
- Huluba, a village in the commune Vulturești, Argeș County
