= Radu Anghel =

Romanian outlaw and folk hero (1827–1865)

Radu Anghel din Greci
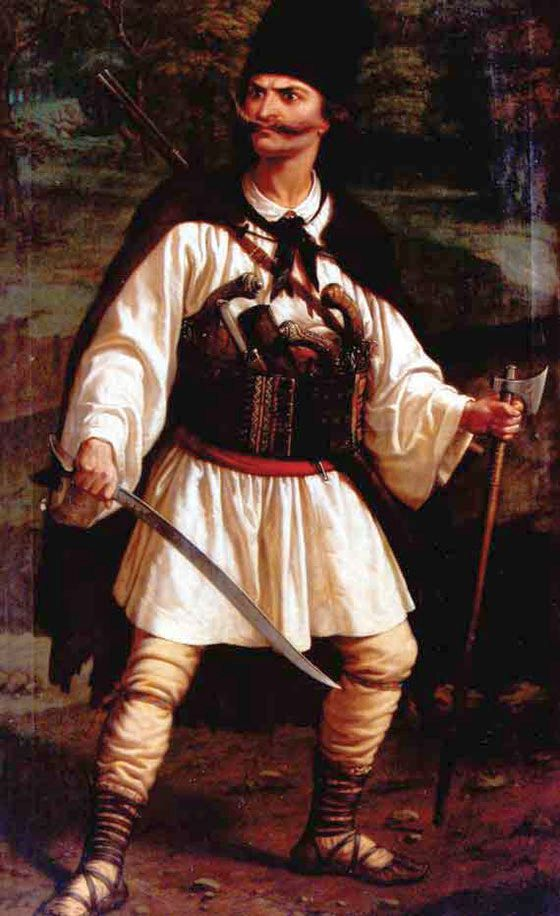
- Mișu Popp's posthumous depiction of Radu Anghel (1865)
- Born: Radu; 1827; Greci, Dâmbovița County, Wallachia
- Died: October 1865 (aged 37–38); Câmpulung, United Principalities
- Cause of death: Gunshot wounds
- Resting place: Câmpulung
- Occupations: Hajduk; smallholder
- Years active: 1842–1865
- Criminal charges: Banditry
- Reward amount: 1,000 lei (1865)
- Wanted by: Wallachia; United Principalities
- Accomplices: Manole al lui Marin Ungureanu; Corporal Ioan; Prica Radului

Details
- Date apprehended: October 1865

Radu Anghel din Greci, also known as Radu Anghelu or Radu lui Anghel (1827 – October 1865), was a Wallachian brigand, or hajduk. As a smallholder in Dâmbovița County, he first delved in illegal activities during his teens, thus protesting against the exploitative boyardom. Leading a gang of outlaws, he established a presence across a zone that covered parts of Dâmbovița, Muscel, and Argeș; he happened to do so at the same time as an outlaw of the exact same name, who was more narrowly focused on the village of Beleți-Negrești, and with whom he was often confused. Always more feared than his namesake, the Radu Anghel of Dâmbovița was beloved by peasants, with his deeds recorded and propagated in Romanian folklore; he was regarded as a generous benefactor and a gentleman thief, though he was noted for sometimes tormenting and torturing his upper-class captives. He became the object of Wallachian manhunts, continued by the Romanian Land Forces upon the establishment of the United Principalities in 1859–1860.

Radu was eventually tracked down to his hiding spot in Râncăciov, and mortally wounded in the resulting battle. He was transported to Câmpulung, where his death was witnessed by artist Mișu Popp, who painted two posthumous portraits of the hajduk. His associates were hunted down and killed over the following days, though some were said to have been alive, and consequently feared by the establishment, into the 1870s. In addition to serving as the inspiration for ballads and anecdotes, his criminal career was memorialized by modern storytellers such as N. D. Popescu-Popnedea and I. C. Vissarion, and officially described as a work of popular emancipation under the Romanian communist regime. Anghel was an indirect inspiration for films directed by Dinu Cocea in the 1960s, and more closely inspired George Cornea's 1993 production, Doi haiduci și o crâșmăriță.

== Biography ==
As early as 1895, Radu's reconstructed biography, penned by scholar Constantin Rădulescu-Codin, noted his being born in Greci, just south of Găești, in 1830. Decades later, folklorist Mihail Robea confirmed the birth place, but corrected the year as 1827. Radu was the son of local peasants Despa and Anghel Gheorghe (from whom he got his second name, a patronymic). The village population was divided between freeholders and sharecroppers; both categories experienced various levels of exploitation under the old Wallachian regime, causing the boy much resentment, and leading him to perform his first acts of brigandage at the age of 15. Immediately after reaching his legal majority, he married a local girl named Rada, alongside whom he cultivated a small property of 38 stânjeni (some 76 square meters). The couple had several daughters, including Oprica, better known as "Prica Radului"—who was always his favorite.

Shortly after, Radu, seeking revenge for his own destitution and the plight of his fellow villagers, decided that he should become an outlaw. He formed a criminal group, and was referred to by his contemporaries as a "commandant" or "captain". According to a peasant tradition, he refused such accolades: always dressing in regular peasant costume, which included opinci footwear, he told his listeners that "captains" never bonded with their troops, and only wore slippers. Radu took his gang of voinici aleși ("selected lads") to the forested areas of Dâmbovița, but also established a presence in neighboring Muscel and Argeș. An early peak of his marauding occurred right after the liberal revolution of 1848, during the conservative restoration effected by Prince Barbu Dimitrie Știrbei. Around 1851, Radu was raiding the Topolog valley, where he chanced upon the local tax farmer, Serdar Nicolae Carada. The two met each other at an inn, where Anghel was traveling incognito; though aware that Carada was carrying large sums of cash "in jam jars", he decided not to attack him. The inn was later raided by a Wallachian state militia, but soundly defeated by Anghel—upon which Știrbei decided that he preferred to ignore the hajduk.

The bandits' subsequent activity covered "the lands between Târgoviște and Câmpulung". The voinici preyed on the boyars, and targeted in particular those engaged in tax farming, also harassing the more hypocritical priests of the Wallachian Church. The gang frequently changed location, and at various times could be found at the Antonoaia cabin in Rădești. It shocked public opinion with its very successful and unexpected raids on the manors of Elena Constantineasca and Dumitrache Gungunoi, upon which they distributed the spoils among the more impoverished sharecroppers. Hajduk Radu continued his activities as Wallachia merged into the United Principalities (1859). At this stage, a degree of confusion was introduced by the activities of another outlaw named Radu Anghel, who had migrated out of Tufeni (now in Olt County) to a hideout at Stana's Inn in Beleți-Negrești, Muscel; the two are distinguished in later literature by their village of origin. The authorities decided to act against the threat, first by allowing Constantineasca to initiate penal procedures. Radu of Greci was tried in absentia, and sentenced to a 6-year term of penal labor (he was also ordered to pay reparations to the tune of 800 Ducats). In another trial of 1861, he received a one-year jail term by a ruling of the Muscel Tribunal.

Radu of Greci made a point of defying the authorities, intensifying his raids. As reported by Codin: "During his final years, he had induced an immeasurable fear in all wealthy men of the mountain villages, namely in those men who had never once ceased defrauding the Romanian peasant." One ballad detailing Radu's exploits has it that he single-handedly tortured the priest Marin of Râncăciov until his victim's family agreed to pay hand out a necklace of coins, as ransom. He then returned the item upon being told by the Marin's daughter that it represented her entire dowry. The state responded by organizing a posse under a Romanian Land Forces officer named Negoescu, and also by offering 1,000 lei for his killing or capture. The manhunt soon became entangled with parallel efforts at tax resistance by the Muscel gentry. In mid-1863, Scarlat Turnavitu of Budișteni was investigated by the authorities after having satirized tax collectors, modifying their letters to the public to read like threats from Radu Anghel.

By 1865, the local government of Muscel took charge of the Anghel affair, mandating Subprefect C. Ianulescu of Nucșoara and Sublieutenant Ioan Palada with locating and liquidating Anghel and "any of [his] presumed hosts or accomplices". The peasants continued to shield Radu from all repercussions, but, as Codin notes, he was finally betrayed by an unnamed party. The clues provided led the authorities to his hiding place at Râncăciov. According to folkloric tradition, he was lodging with a local known as Corporal Ioan, and could only be safely approached because his comrades were inebriated. A shootout ensued on Cârstienilor Hill. While some accounts suggest that he died there, others offer contrasting detail—namely, that he was gravely wounded, then transported in shackles by Palada to Câmpulung, where he eventually bled out. The news was covered enthusiastically in the conservative newspaper Trompetta Carpaților:

We congratulate the administration for no longer allowing humanitarian lawyers to exhibit their skills, in their effort of proving that Radu Anghel is a decent man, useful to society as a whole; for never giving courtrooms an opportunity to find a balance between appearances and legal textualism; for never allowing prison wardens a chance to let such a monster escape.

== Legacy ==
Anghel's death was witnessed by painter Mișu Popp, who was working on the restoration of Saint Nicholas Church. He was inspired to paint a full-scale portrait of the deceased, which he was allowed to display at the local city hall; Popp's canvass was much appreciated by the public, and was put on display at the Exposition Universelle of 1867 (it is presently at the National Museum of Art of Romania, while a smaller version was purchased by the Brukenthal National Museum). According to art historian Dan Grigorescu, Popp selected his subject matter to fit in with the Romantic trend, and specifically with the elevation of outlaws in novels by Walter Scott, but its execution, like in all other works by the same painter, was strictly academic.

Radu Anghel was probably buried at the Holy Trinity Church in downtown Câmpulung. The building disappeared, but his attributed grave, marked with a commemorative inscription, was maintained as the central feature of a small municipal park. He was survived by his family, including his father and daughters (Anghel Gheorghe died in 1866, leaving his fortune to Prica). Ianulescu and Palada reported the manhunt as complete when, in mid-October 1865, a platoon of Dorobanți located his companion Manole al lui Marin Ungureanu in Gorganu, shooting him summarily and leaving his body to decompose on the spot. Anghel of Tufeni had also been captured, but only sentenced to a seven-months jail term. The "Republic of Ploiești" incident of 1870, which saw a roundup of Romanian left-liberals, also touched Argeș and Muscel. Identified as head of the local liberal rebels, Ion Brătianu was kept in custody at Câmpulung; his wife Pia expressed worries that the authorities had released Anghel of Greci's remaining accomplices, and were using them to stage extrajudicial killings.

Anghel inspired an 1883 story paper by N. D. Popescu-Popnedea, published by H. Steinberg of Bucharest. The deceased hajduk was perceived as a peasant hero well into the 20th century, and lionized as such by several eponymous folk ballads—one of these was sung at all weddings in Rociu, causing the older guests to sob collectively; another one mentioned his daughter Prica, admired for her own adoption of the hajduk lifestyle, and depicted as riding a steed festooned in gold and silver. However, several such poems conflate Radu's activities with those of his contemporary in Beleți-Negrești—including a locally famous song about Radu's passage through Bradului Forest. Apocryphal stories also began circulating, with some rendered in writing by Codin during the early decades of the Romanian Kingdom. At Suslănești, they recorded an anecdote about the friendly interaction between a local peasant, Simon (who was coincidentally the ancestor of Codin's colleague, Dan Simonescu), and Anghel, during which the brigand decided not to raid Simon's home. At Huluba, the Anghel myth intertwined with worship of Alexandru Ioan Cuza, who was reigning Domnitor of the United Principalities at the time of Anghel's killing. According to this account, Cuza had magnanimously spared the hajduk, since he agreed with his goal of peasant emancipation. Accounts of his death were embellished, with one variant suggesting that he could only be killed by a soldier who knew his secret (namely, that he could only be harmed by a coin fragment, shot out of a regular rifle), and that his chopped-off head was brought before Cuza—who rejected the gift, and mourned for the brigand.

In a 1912 piece, journalist A. Camb expressed concern that "the most disgusting bandits", Anghel included, had been elevated as folk heroes, and were being seen as heralds of Romanian nationalism (under the assumption that their boyar victims were foreigners). As scholarly and literary interest was being revived, some authors focused on finding witnesses to his brigandage. Codin spoke to Anghel's Lăutar, Marin Colțatu of Geamăna (said to have been aged 102 in 1913); one of the posse members still lived into advanced old age at Rucăr, but was booed by generations of children whenever he stepped out of his home. Rucăr also conserved the shortest version of the Anghel ballad, which omits most topographical elements. As noted by scholar Ovidiu Bârlea, this is because that portion of Muscel was rarely a target for his terror: "[his] deeds awakened no interest whatsoever, as far as listeners were concerned". In 1920, I. C. Vissarion included Radu as a background character in his novel, Petre Pârcălabul. As late as 1924, scholar Nicolae Iorga was arguing that Anghel's biography had been included in internationally famous novels of Panait Istrati.

Lăutar Alexandru Cercel of Boțești complained that, by 1947, very few of his audience enjoyed his "mournful" songs about brigands, and that they simply laughed off his attempts to sing about Radu Anghel. All hajduks were revived culturally under the communist regime (1948–1989)—in 1958, the Union of Working Youth sponsored work on Anghel's tomb; in 1964, Ion Bănuță included ample and positive references to Anghel in his communist-inspired poetic cycle, Scrisoare către anul 2000. In 1967, writer Baruțu T. Arghezi proposed that Antonoaia cabin be turned into a commemorative museum. Two years later, Dinu Cocea was working on his loose adaptations of hajduk narratives, with the twin productions Haiducii lui Șaptecai and Săptămîna nebunilor, with a titular character called "Anghel" (played by Florin Piersic). Both were filmed in Muscel area, selected specifically as an homage to Radu. A decade later, President Nicolae Ceaușescu personally advised Cocea that he should work on films about Anghel, Iancu Jianu, and other "well-known hajduks, men who have had a real-life existence and who have entered folk consciousness."

In 1981, industrial worker Vasile Neagu, who believed that a beech tree in Râu Alb marked a spot tied to Radu Anghel, campaigned to have the location declared a nature preserve. As reported by the poet and local historian Ion Nania, Radu Anghel was the sole subject of a 710-page manuscript by Iacov Cârciumărescu of Topoloveni. Nania also contends that the work, though outstanding for its thoroughness, was never granted permission for print by the communist censors, owing to Cârciumărescu's political file. Another scientific monograph was produced in 1950 by Bârlea for the Romanian Folklore Institute, but was still unpublished by 1996. The Anghel legend still had echoes after the Romanian Revolution of 1989. In 1993, George Cornea directed the film Doi haiduci și o crâșmăriță, in which Radu Anghel (Răzvan Ionescu) and his innkeeper companion Stana (Manuela Hărăbor) take their revenge on a villainous young boyar.
