= Huluba (Argeșel) =

- Location within Romania

Location
- Country: Romania
- Counties: Argeș County
- Villages: Huluba

Physical characteristics
- Mouth: Argeșel
  - location: Davidești
  - coordinates: 45.0074°N 25.0434°E
- Length: 13 km (8.1 mi)
- Basin size: 18 km^{2} (6.9 sq mi)

Basin features
- Progression: Argeșel→ Râul Târgului→ Râul Doamnei→ Argeș→ Danube→ Black Sea

The Huluba is a right tributary of the river Argeșel in Romania. It flows into the Argeșel in Davidești. Its length is 13 km (8.1 mi) and its basin size is 18 km^{2} (6.9 sq mi).
