= Văleni-Dâmbovița =

- Commune
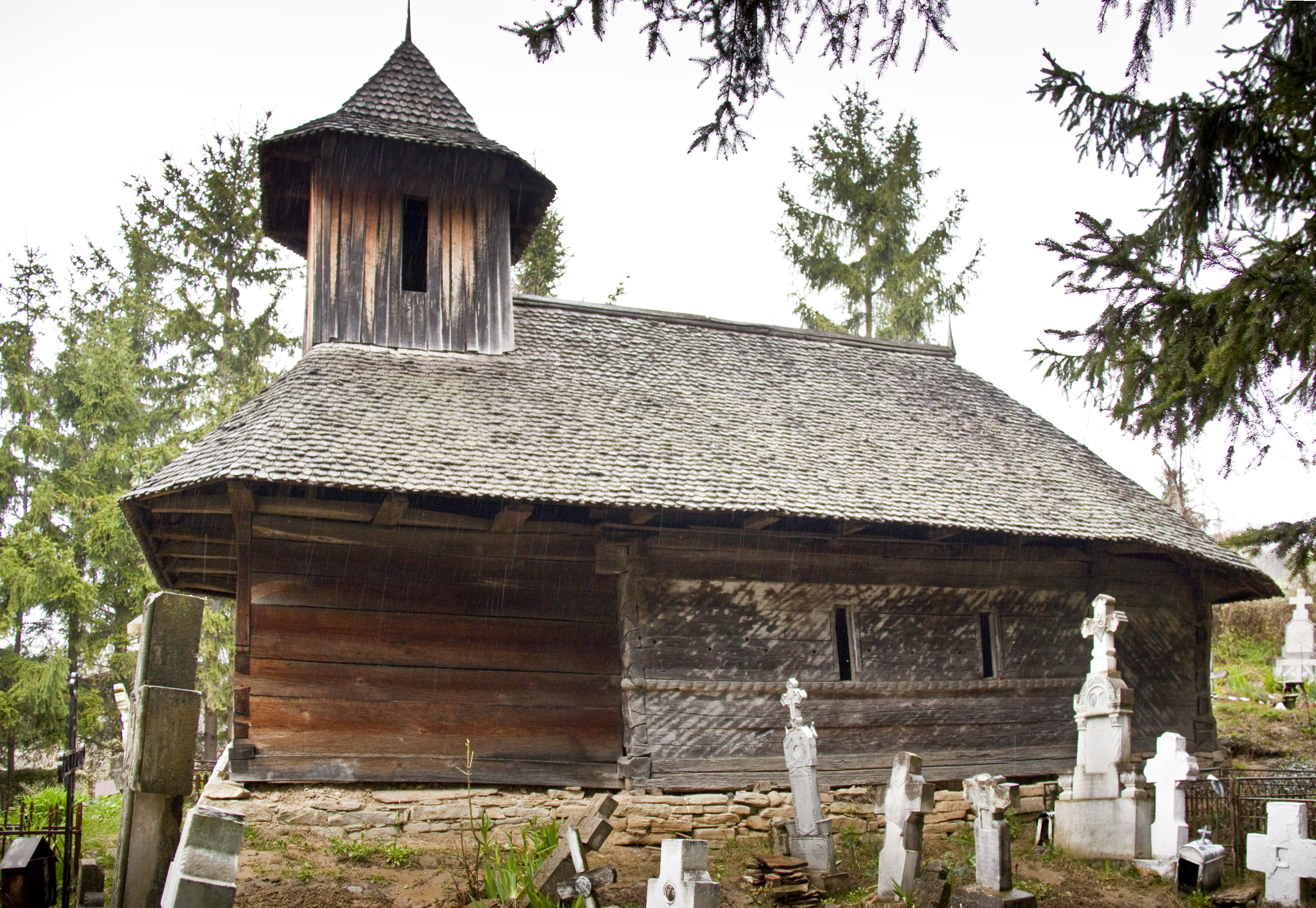
- Wooden church in Mesteacăn

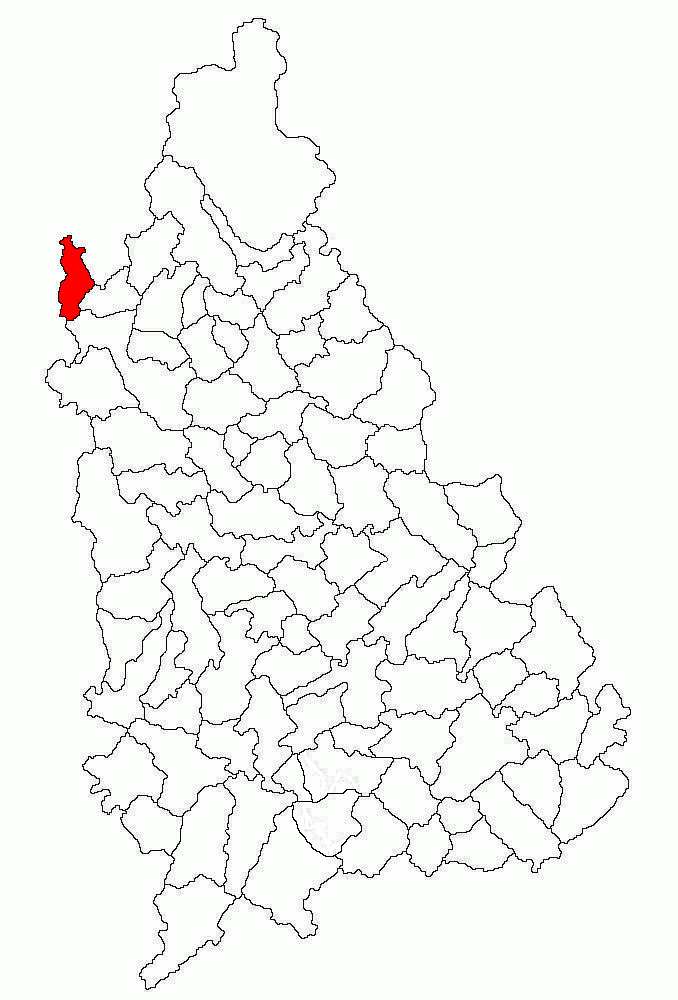
- Location in Dâmbovița County

- Location in Romania
- Coordinates: 45.165°N 25.174°E
- Country: Romania
- County: Dâmbovița

Government
  - Mayor (2020–2024): Marian Lungu (PSD)
- Area: 27.88 km^{2} (10.76 sq mi)
- Elevation: 546 m (1,791 ft)
- Population (2021-12-01): 2,420
  - Density: 86.8/km^{2} (225/sq mi)
- Time zone: UTC+02:00 (EET)
  - Summer (DST): UTC+03:00 (EEST)
- Postal code: 137500
- Area code: +(40) 245
- Vehicle reg.: DB
- Website: primariavalenidambovita.ro

Văleni is a commune in Dâmbovița County, Muntenia, Romania with a population of 2,420 people as of 2021. It is composed of two villages, Văleni-Dâmbovița (the commune center) and Mesteacăn.

== Geography ==
The commune is located in the northwestern extremity of Dâmbovița County, 44 km (27 mi) from the county seat, Târgoviște, on the border with Argeș County. It lies on the banks of the river Mușcel, in a hilly area in the foothills of the Southern Carpathians.

Văleni is crossed by the county road DJ723, which connects the valley of the river Dâmbovița and the national road DN72A with the valley of the river Argeș and DN73D.

== History ==
At the end of the 19th century, Văleni was part of plasa Argeșel in Muscel County and included the villages of Lunca, Plopișoru, Văleni, and Vrăbiești, with a total population of 1,781 inhabitants. By 1925, the commune had 2,460 inhabitants and consisted of the single village of Văleni. Since in the same county there were two communes with the same name (the other one was in plasa Golești), the commune (which by now also contained the village of Mesteacăn) was renamed Văleni-Dâmbovița in 1931.

Historical population
Year	Pop.	±%
2002	2,960	—
2011	2,754	−7.0%
2021	2,420	−12.1%
Source: Census data
