= Poienarii de Muscel =

- Commune
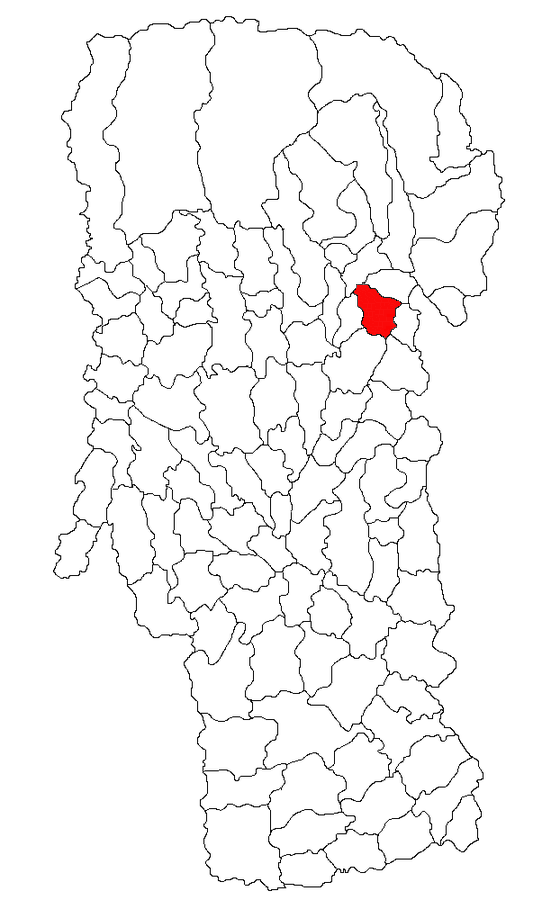
- Location in Argeș County

- Location in Romania
- Coordinates: 45°10′N 25°5′E
- Country: Romania
- County: Argeș
- Area: 38.6 km^{2} (14.9 sq mi)
- Elevation: 609 m (1,998 ft)
- Population (2021-12-01): 2,928
  - Density: 76/km^{2} (200/sq mi)
- Time zone: EET/EEST (UTC+2/+3)
- Area code: +(40) 248
- Vehicle reg.: AG

Poienarii de Muscel is a commune in Argeș County, Muntenia, Romania. It is composed of five villages: Groșani, Jugur, Poienari (the commune center), Șerbănești, and Valea Îndărăt.
