= Mușcel (river) =

- Location within Romania

Location
- Country: Romania
- Counties: Dâmbovița County
- Villages: Mesteacăn, Văleni-Dâmbovița

Physical characteristics
- Mouth: Dâmbovița
  - location: near Malu cu Flori
  - coordinates: 45.1632°N 25.2068°E
- Length: 8 km (5.0 mi)
- Basin size: 17 km^{2} (6.6 sq mi)

Basin features
- Progression: Dâmbovița→ Argeș→ Danube→ Black Sea

The Mușcel is a right tributary of the river Dâmbovița in Romania. It flows into the Dâmbovița near Malu cu Flori. Its length is 8 km (5.0 mi) and its basin size is 17 km^{2} (6.6 sq mi).
