= Hârtiești =

- Commune
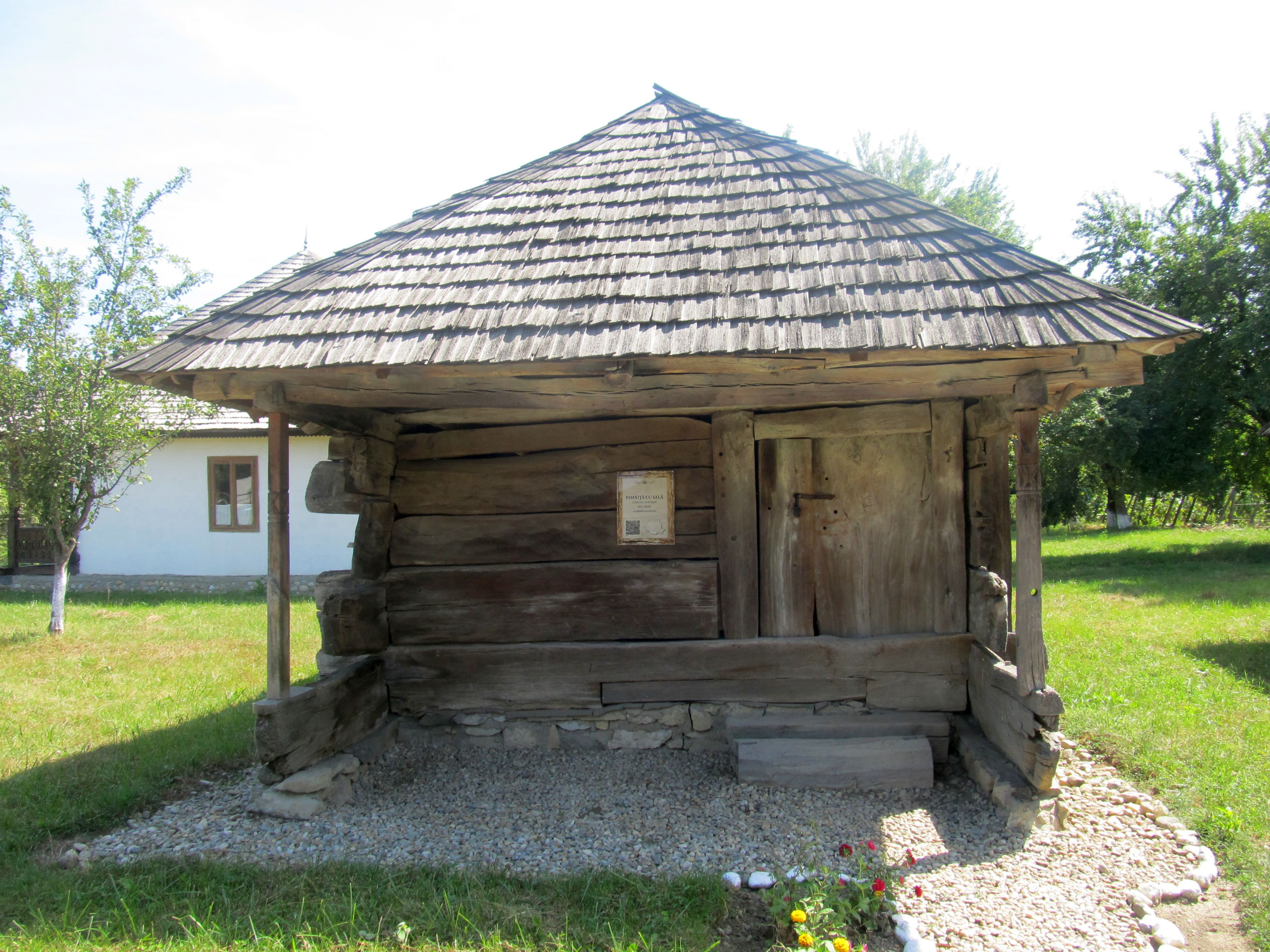
- Traditional cellar in Hârtiești

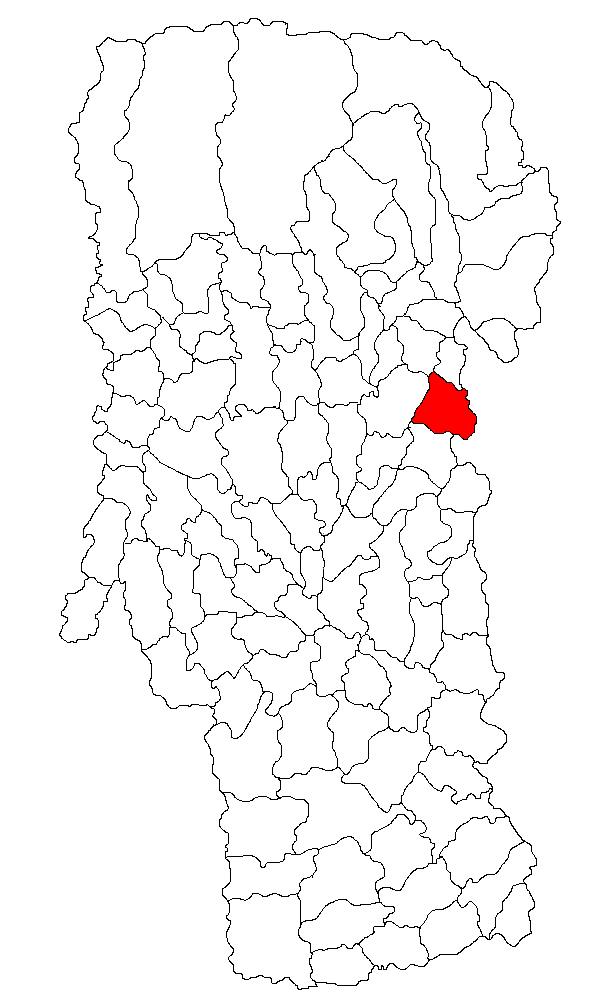
- Location in Argeș County

- Location in Romania
- Coordinates: 45°01′N 24°58′E
- Country: Romania
- County: Argeș

Government
  - Mayor (2020–2024): Ion-Cosmin Ștefan (PSD)
- Area: 48.82 km^{2} (18.85 sq mi)
- Elevation: 461 m (1,512 ft)
- Population (2021-12-01): 2,216
  - Density: 45.39/km^{2} (117.6/sq mi)
- Time zone: UTC+02:00 (EET)
  - Summer (DST): UTC+03:00 (EEST)
- Postal code: 117395
- Area code: +(40) 248
- Vehicle reg.: AG
- Website: comunahartiesti.ro

Hârtiești is a commune in Argeș County, Muntenia, Romania. It is composed of four villages: Dealu, Hârtiești, Lespezi, and Lucieni. It also included the villages of Bârzești, Huluba, and Vulturești until 2003, when these were split off to form Vulturești Commune.
