= Davidești =

- Commune
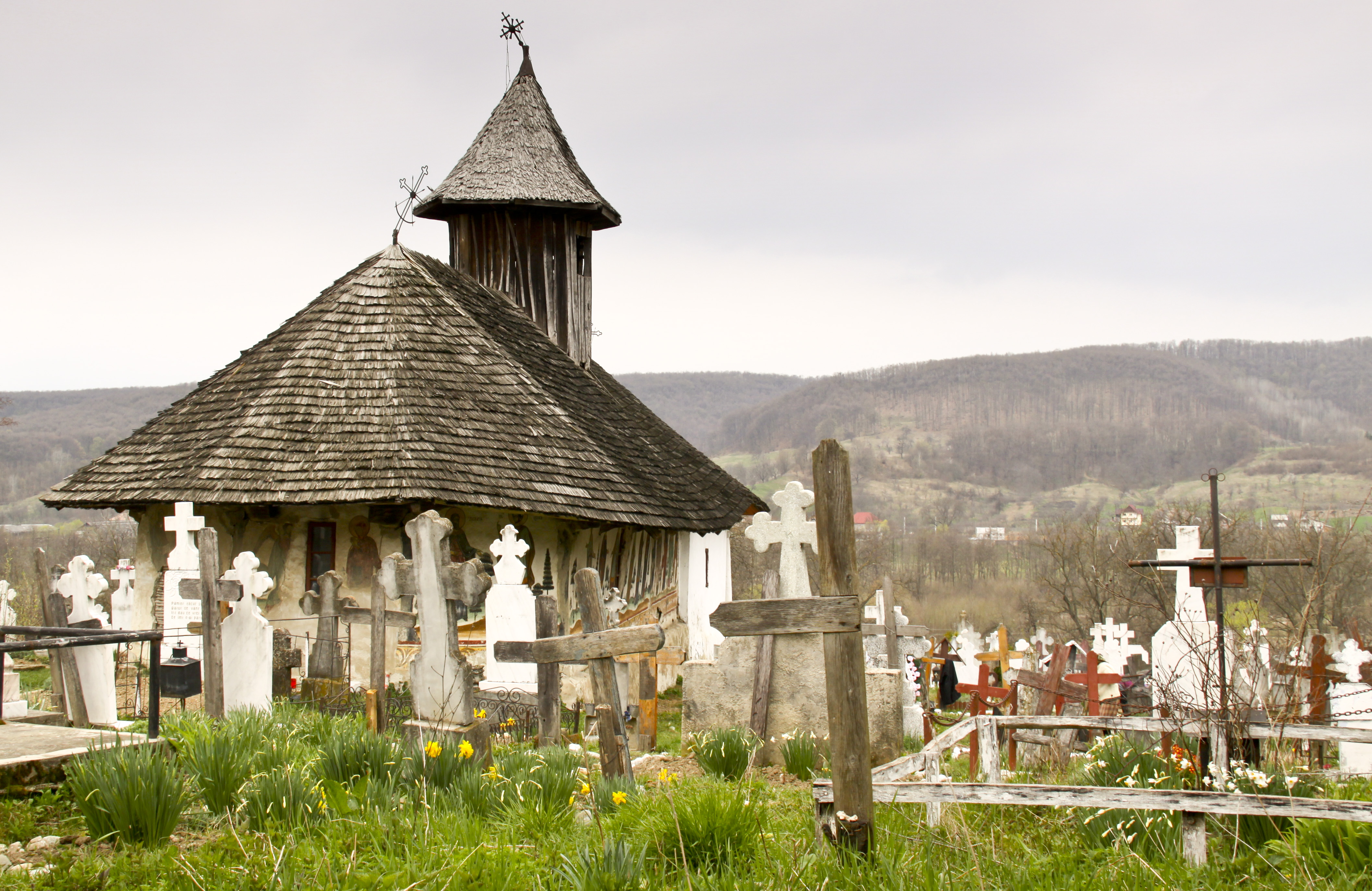
- Wooden church in Voroveni

- Location in Romania
- Coordinates: 45.0078°N 25.0487°E
- Country: Romania
- County: Argeș

Government
  - Mayor (2024–2028): Constantin Alin Văduva (PSD)
- Area: 41.87 km^{2} (16.17 sq mi)
- Elevation: 381 m (1,250 ft)
- Population (2021-12-01): 3,029
  - Density: 72.34/km^{2} (187.4/sq mi)
- Time zone: UTC+02:00 (EET)
  - Summer (DST): UTC+03:00 (EEST)
- Postal code: 117350
- Area code: +(40) 248
- Vehicle reg.: AG
- Website: primariadavidesti.ro

Davidești is a commune in Argeș County. Muntenia, Romania. It is composed of three villages: Conțești, Davidești, and Voroveni.
