= Boteni =

- Commune
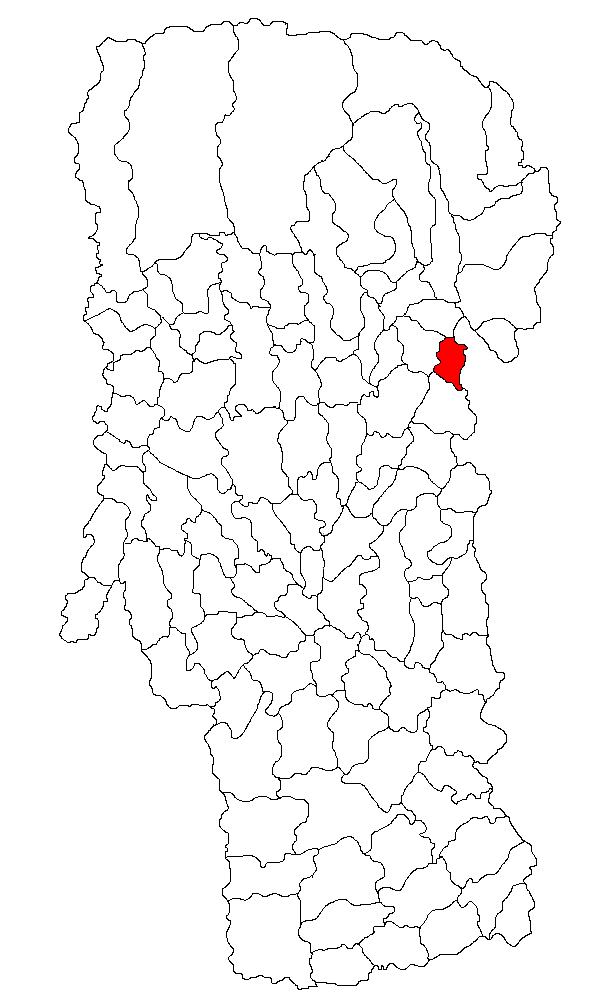
- Location in Argeș County

- Location in Romania
- Coordinates: 45°10′N 25°7′E
- Country: Romania
- County: Argeș
- Subdivisions: Boteni, Bălăbani, Muscel, Luncă

Government
  - Mayor (2020–2024): Vasile Leau (PSD)
- Area: 24.06 km^{2} (9.29 sq mi)
- Elevation: 545 m (1,788 ft)
- Population (2021-12-01): 2,116
  - Density: 87.95/km^{2} (227.8/sq mi)
- Time zone: UTC+02:00 (EET)
  - Summer (DST): UTC+03:00 (EEST)
- Postal code: 117130
- Area code: +(40) 248
- Vehicle reg.: AG
- Website: comunaboteni.ro

Boteni is a commune in Argeș County, Muntenia, Romania. It is composed of four villages: Balabani, Boteni, Lunca, and Muscel.

The commune is located in the northeastern part of the county, on the border with Dâmbovița County. It lies in the foothills of the Southern Carpathians, on the banks of the Argeș River.

Historical population
Year	Pop.	±%
2002	2,739	—
2011	2,495	−8.9%
2021	2,116	−15.2%
Source: Census data

== Natives ==
- Petre Țuțea (1902–1991), philosopher, journalist, and economist
