= Muscel County =

Județul Muscel
- County (Județ)
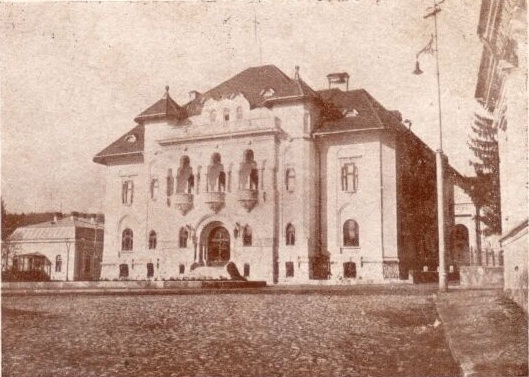
- The Muscel County Prefecture's building from the interwar period, now Câmpulung city hall.

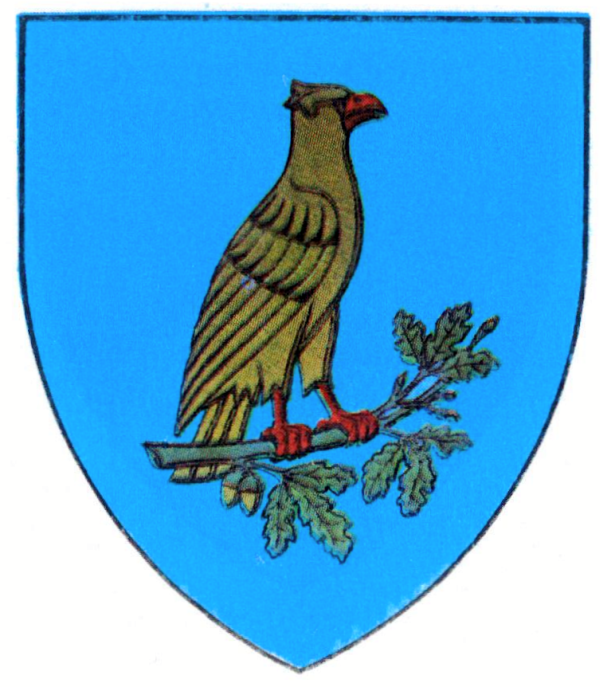
- Coat of arms

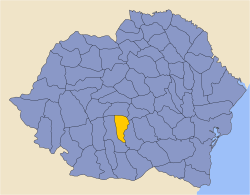
- Country: Romania
- Historic region: Muntenia
- County seat (Reședință de județ): Câmpulung
- Established: Sometime before 1601
- Ceased to exist: Administrative reform of 1950

Area
  - Total: 3,058 km^{2} (1,181 sq mi)

Population (1930)
  - Total: 149,797
  - Density: 48.99/km^{2} (126.9/sq mi)
- Time zone: UTC+2 (EET)
  - Summer (DST): UTC+3 (EEST)

Muscel County is a former first-order administrative district of Romania. It was located in the southern central part of Greater Romania, in the northwestern part of the historic region of Muntenia. Its territory is now mostly part of Argeș County, while some communes (Malu cu Flori, Pucheni and Văleni-Dâmbovița) now belong to Dâmbovița County. The county seat was Câmpulung.

The county was bordered on the west by Argeș County, to the north by the counties of Făgăraș and Brașov, and to the east by Dâmbovița County.

In 1938, the county was disestablished and incorporated into the newly formed Ținutul Argeș, but it was re-established in 1940 after the fall of Carol II's regime – only to be abolished on 6 September 1950 by the Communist regime.

== Administrative organization ==
The counties of Wallachia after 1601, including Muscel

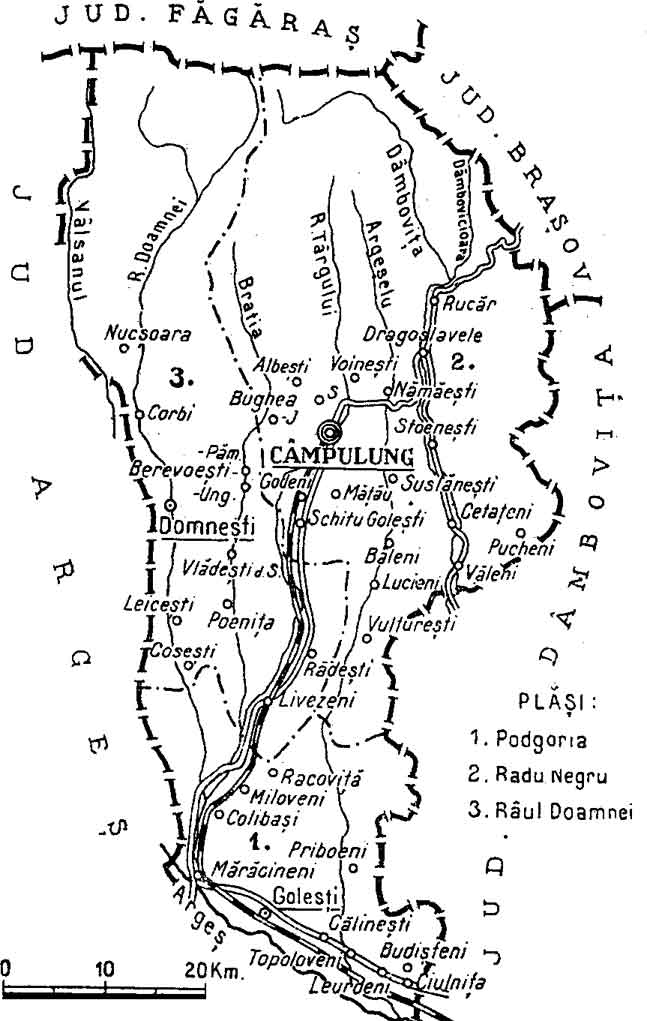
Map of Muscel County, as constituted in 1938.

Administratively, Muscel County was originally divided into two districts (plăși):

1. Plasa Podgoria
2. Plasa Radu-Negru

Subsequently a third district was established:

3. Plasa Râul Doamnei

By 1938, the county was divided administratively into six districts:

1. Plasa Argeșel
2. Plasa Dâmbovița
3. Plasa Podgoria
4. Plasa Râul Doamnei
5. Plasa Râurile
6. Plasa Golești

== Population ==
According to the 1930 census data, the county population was 149,797 inhabitants, ethnically divided as follows: 97.1% Romanians, 2.3% Romanies, 0.2% Hungarians, as well as other minorities. From the religious point of view, 99.3% Orthodox, 0.3% Roman Catholic, as well as other minorities.

=== Urban population ===
In 1930, the county's urban population was 13,868 inhabitants, ethnically divided as follows: 95.4% Romanians, 1.2% Hungarians, 0.9% Romanies, 0.5% Germans, as well as other minorities. From the religious point of view, the urban population was composed of 95.8% Eastern Orthodox, 2.2% Roman Catholic, 0.6% Reformed (Calvinist), 0.4% Evangelical (Lutheran), 0.3% Baptist, 0.2% Greek Catholic, as well as other minorities.

== Industry ==
A paper factory (Câmpulungul S. A.) functioned within the county seat, the town of Câmpulung, as of 1931.
