= Vulturești, Argeș =

Vulturești
- Commune
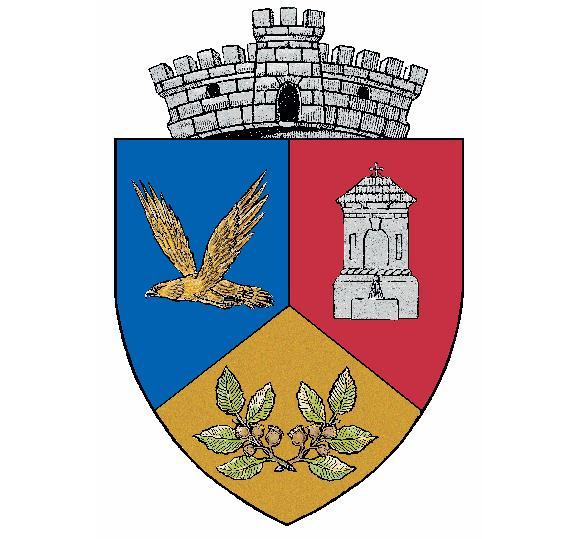
- Coat of arms

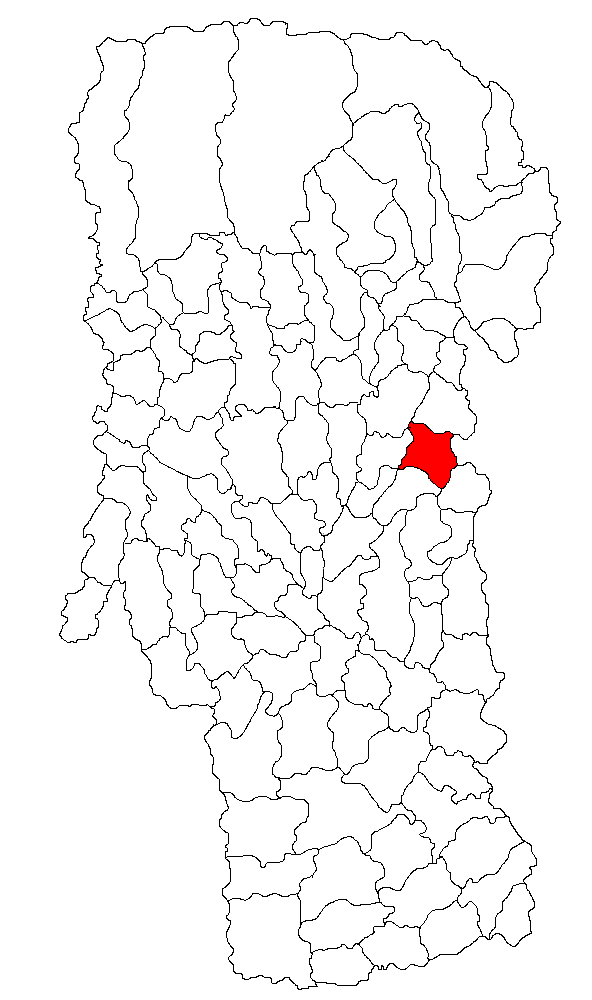
- Location in Argeș County

- Location in Romania
- Coordinates: 45.0567°N 25.0945°E
- Country: Romania
- County: Argeș

Government
  - Mayor (2020–2024): Liviu-Eugen Poșircă (PSD)
- Area: 48.08 km^{2} (18.56 sq mi)
- Highest elevation: 656 m (2,152 ft)
- Lowest elevation: 390 m (1,280 ft)
- Population (2021-12-01): 2,773
  - Density: 58/km^{2} (150/sq mi)
- Time zone: EET/EEST (UTC+2/+3)
- Postal code: 117402
- Vehicle reg.: AG
- Website: www.cjarges.ro/en/web/vulturesti

Vulturești is a commune in Argeș County, Muntenia, Romania. It is composed of three villages: Bârzești, Huluba and Vulturești. These were part of Hârtiești Commune until 2003, when they were split off.

The commune is located in the eastern part of the county, on the border with Dâmbovița County. It lies at a distance of 31 km (19 mi) from the county seat, Pitești, 34 km (21 mi) from Câmpulung, and 141 km (88 mi) from Bucharest. The 25th meridian east passes 3 km (1.9 mi) to the west of Vulturești, while the 45th parallel north passes 5 km (3.1 mi) to the south.
