= List of settlements in Călărași County =

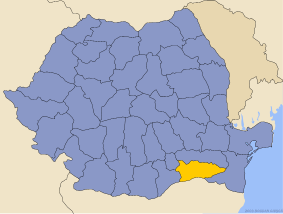
Călărași County in Romania

This is a list of settlements in Călărași County, Romania.

The following are the county's cities and towns, along with their attached villages:

| City/Town | Villages |
|---|---|
| Călărași | |
| Oltenița | |
| Budești | Aprozi, Buciumeni, Gruiu |
| Fundulea | Alexandru Ioan Cuza, Gostilele |
| Lehliu Gară | Buzoeni, Răzvani, Valea Seacă |

The following are the county's communes, with component villages:

| Commune | Villages |
|---|---|
| Alexandru Odobescu | Alexandru Odobescu, Nicolae Bălcescu, Gălățui |
| Belciugatele | Belciugatele, Cândeasca, Cojești, Mataraua, Măriuța |
| Borcea | Borcea |
| Căscioarele | Căscioarele |
| Chirnogi | Chirnogi |
| Chiselet | Chiselet |
| Ciocănești | Ciocănești |
| Crivăț | Crivăț |
| Curcani | Curcani, Sălcioara |
| Cuza Vodă | Călărașii Vechi, Ceacu, Cuza Vodă |
| Dichiseni | Coslogeni, Dichiseni, Libertatea, Satnoeni |
| Dor Mărunt | Dâlga, Dâlga-Gară, Dor Mărunt, Înfrățirea, Ogoru, Pelinu |
| Dorobanțu | Boșneagu, Dorobanțu, Vărăști |
| Dragalina | Constantin Brâncoveanu, Dragalina, Drajna Nouă |
| Dragoș Vodă | Bogdana, Dragoș Vodă, Socoalele |
| Frăsinet | Curătești, Dănești, Frăsinet, Frăsinetu de Jos, Luptători, Tăriceni |
| Frumușani | Frumușani, Orăști, Pasărea, Pădurișu, Pițigaia, Postăvari |
| Fundeni | Fundeni |
| Gălbinași | Gălbinași |
| Grădiștea | Bogata, Cunești, Grădiștea, Rasa |
| Gurbănești | Codreni, Coțofanca, Gurbănești, Preasna, Preasna Veche, Valea Presnei |
| Ileana | Arțari, Florica, Ileana, Podari, Răsurile, Răzoarele, Satu Nou, Ștefănești, Vlăiculești |
| Independența | Independența, Potcoava, Vișinii |
| Jegălia | Gâldău, Iezeru, Jegălia |
| Lehliu | Lehliu, Săpunari |
| Luica | Luica, Valea Stânii |
| Lupșanu | Lupșanu, Nucetu, Plevna, Radu Vodă, Valea Rusului |
| Mânăstirea | Coconi, Mânăstirea, Sultana |
| Mitreni | Clătești, Mitreni, Valea Roșie |
| Modelu | Modelu, Radu Negru, Stoenești, Tonea |
| Nana | Nana |
| Nicolae Bălcescu | Fântâna Doamnei, Nicolae Bălcescu, Paicu |
| Perișoru | Mărculești-Gară, Perișoru, Tudor Vladimirescu |
| Plătărești | Cucuieți, Dorobanțu, Plătărești, Podu Pitarului |
| Radovanu | Radovanu, Valea Popii |
| Roseți | Roseți |
| Sărulești | Măgureni, Polcești, Săndulița, Sărulești, Sărulești-Gară, Sătucu, Solacolu |
| Sohatu | Progresu, Sohatu |
| Spanțov | Cetatea Veche, Spanțov, Stancea |
| Șoldanu | Negoești, Șoldanu |
| Ștefan cel Mare | Ștefan cel Mare |
| Ștefan Vodă | Ștefan Vodă |
| Tămădău Mare | Călăreți, Dârvari, Plumbuita, Săcele, Șeinoiu, Tămădău Mare, Tămădău Mic |
| Ulmeni | Ulmeni |
| Ulmu | Chirnogi, Făurei, Ulmu, Zimbru |
| Unirea | Oltina, Unirea |
| Valea Argovei | Lunca, Ostrovu, Siliștea, Valea Argovei, Vlădiceasca |
| Vasilați | Nuci, Popești, Vasilați |
| Vâlcelele | Floroaica, Vâlcelele |
| Vlad Țepeș | Mihai Viteazu, Vlad Țepeș |
