= Berza =

- Location within Romania

Location
- Country: Romania
- Counties: Călărași County
- Villages: Mihai Viteazu, Nicolae Bălcescu, Gălățui

Physical characteristics
- Mouth: Danube
  - coordinates: 44.1433°N 27.1293°E
- Length: 26 km (16 mi)

Basin features
- Progression: Danube→ Black Sea

The Berza is a small tributary of the Danube in Călărași County, Romania. It passes through Lake Gălățui, and discharges into the Danube near Bogata, west of Călărași. Its length is 26 km (16 mi).
