= Luica (river) =

- Location within Romania

Location
- Country: Romania
- Counties: Călărași County
- Villages: Nana, Luica, Curcani

Physical characteristics
- Mouth: Argeș
  - location: Curcani
  - coordinates: 44.1967°N 26.5701°E
- Length: 17 km (11 mi)
- Basin size: 150 km^{2} (58 sq mi)

Basin features
- Progression: Argeș→ Danube→ Black Sea

The Luica is a left tributary of the river Argeș in Romania. It discharges into the Argeș in Curcani. Its length is 17 km (11 mi) and its basin size is 150 km^{2} (58 sq mi).
