= Cucuveanu =

- Location within Romania

Location
- Country: Romania
- Counties: Călărași County
- Villages: Dor Mărunt, Nucetu, Lupșanu, Radu Vodă

Physical characteristics
- Mouth: Argova
  - coordinates: 44.3325°N 26.9060°E
- Length: 23 km (14 mi)
- Basin size: 157 km^{2} (61 sq mi)

Basin features
- Progression: Argova→ Mostiștea→ Danube→ Black Sea

The Cucuveanu is a left tributary of the river Argova in Romania. It flows into the Argova near Zimbru. Its length is 23 km (14 mi) and its basin size is 157 km^{2} (61 sq mi).
