= Argova =

River in Romania

- Location within Romania

Location
- Country: Romania
- Counties: Călărași County
- Villages: Buzoeni, Valea Argovei

Physical characteristics
- Mouth: Mostiștea
  - coordinates: 44.283°N 26.856°E
- Length: 23 km (14 mi)

Basin features
- Progression: Mostiștea→ Danube→ Black Sea
- Tributaries
  - left: Cucuveanu

The Argova is a left tributary of the river Mostiștea in Romania. It flows into the Mostiștea in Curătești. Its length is 23 km (14 mi).
