= Rasa (Argeș) =

- Location within Romania

Location
- Country: Romania
- Counties: Călărași County
- Villages: Progresu, Aprozi

Physical characteristics
- Mouth: Argeș
  - coordinates: 44.2229°N 26.5105°E
- Length: 22 km (14 mi)
- Basin size: 94 km^{2} (36 sq mi)

Basin features
- Progression: Argeș→ Danube→ Black Sea

The Rasa is a left tributary of the river Argeș in Romania. It discharges into the Argeș in Șoldanu. Its length is 22 km (14 mi) and its basin size is 94 km^{2} (36 sq mi).
