= Independența =

Independenţa may refer to several places in Romania:

- Independența, a commune in Călărași County
- Independența, a commune in Constanța County
- Independența, a commune in Galați County
- Independența, a village in Gherghița Commune, Prahova County
- Murighiol, a commune in Tulcea County, called Independența from 1983 to 1996

A ship

- M/T Independența, a Romanian crude carrier, which burnt and sank due to a catastrophic accident after collision in Bosphorus, Turkey.
