= Valea Stânii =

Valea Stânii may refer to several villages in Romania:

- Valea Stânii, a village in Țițești Commune, Argeș County
- Valea Stânii, a village in Luica Commune, Călărași County
