= Jegălia =

- Commune
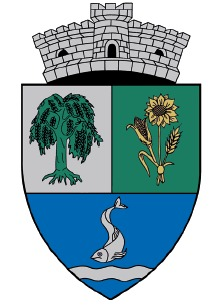
- Coat of arms

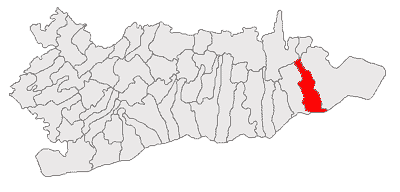
- Location in Călărași County

- Location in Romania
- Coordinates: 44°18′N 27°38′E
- Country: Romania
- County: Călărași

Government
  - Mayor (2024–2028): Aurel Vasile (PNL)
- Area: 108.31 km^{2} (41.82 sq mi)
- Elevation: 19 m (62 ft)
- Population (2021-12-01): 3,858
  - Density: 35.62/km^{2} (92.26/sq mi)
- Time zone: UTC+02:00 (EET)
  - Summer (DST): UTC+03:00 (EEST)
- Postal code: 917145
- Area code: +(40) 242
- Vehicle reg.: CL
- Website: primariajegalia.ro

Jegălia is a commune in Călărași County, Muntenia, Romania. It is composed of three villages: Gâldău, Iezeru, and Jegălia. As of 2021, Jegălia had a population of 3,858.

The commune is located in the southeastern part of the county, in the southern reaches of the Bărăgan Plain. It borders the Borcea branch of the Danube River to the south, Unirea commune to the west, Perișoru commune to the north, and Borcea commune to the east.

Jegălia is traversed by national road DN3B, which runs from the county seat, Călărași, 32 km (20 mi) to the east, to Fetești, a city in Ialomița County, 19 km (12 mi) to the east. There is also a train station that serves the CFR Line 800, which connects Bucharest to the Black Sea coast.

The Romanian Army's Test and Evaluation Center, named after major general Ștefan Burileanu, is located in Jegălia; the testing grounds cover some 30 square kilometres (12 square miles), roughly 15 by 3 km (9.3 by 1.9 mi).

Historical population
Year	Pop.	±%
2002	4,815	—
2011	4,229	−12.2%
2021	3,858	−8.8%
Source: Census data
