= Aurel Mihale =

Romanian writer (1922–2007)

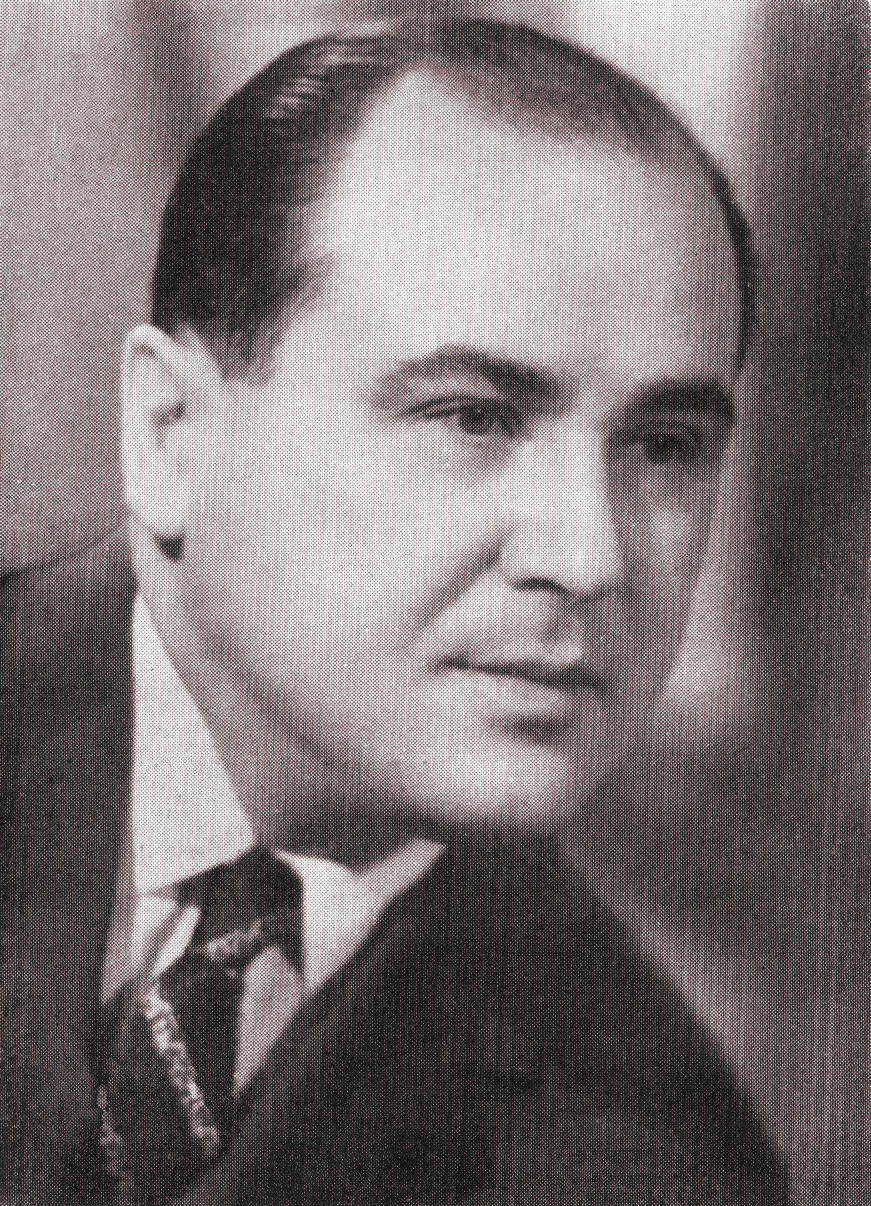
Romanian writer Aurel Mihale 1964

Aurel Mihale (August 7, 1922 – 2007) was a Romanian prose writer.

Born in Spanțov, Călărași County, his parents Ignat and Elena (née Mitu) were peasants. Mihale passed his baccalauréat at Chișinău in 1942, during World War II. From that time until 1944, he studied at the reserve officers’ school. He was mobilized to Constanța in 1944. Following Romania's turn to the Allies, he saw combat on the Czechoslovak front. From 1945 to 1947, he attended the Philology and Law faculties of the University of Bucharest.

From 1949 to 1954, after the establishment of a communist regime, he was employed in higher education. He held leadership positions in the umbrella trade union of artists, writers and journalists; in the Writers' Union of Romania; and in the state committee for culture and art. He was deputy editor-in-chief of Viața Românească (1953-1954) and editor-in-chief of Luceafărul (1958-1959) and Gazeta literară (1962). Monica Lovinescu records an anecdote from 1971, during the session where dictator Nicolae Ceaușescu presented the July Theses to a group of writers. Mihale, a “notorious Stalinist”, offered such an impassioned recitation of the canon encompassing socialist realism in Romania that even Ceaușescu was embarrassed by the author's zeal.

Mihale made his literary debut in 1943, publishing antiwar poetry in Dacia rediviva magazine. His works included tales (Nopți înfrigurate, 1957; Hotărârea, 1964; Somnul de veghe, 1969), sketches (Ultimul asalt, 1955; Forța ascunsă, 1973), short stories (Vin apele, 1950; În pragul primăverii, 1952; Poartă și drum, 1971; Nimeni nu moare singur, 1974; Vatra, 1974; Șase nopți și șase zile, 1984) and novels (Ogoare noi, 1953; Floarea vieții, 1954; Destin, 1960; Fuga, 1963; Cronică de război, I-III, 1967; Primăvara timpurie, 1969; Focurile, I-III, 1977–1978; Acțiunea „Hildebrand”, 1979; Îngerul negru, 1981; Alertă în munți, 1982).
