= Ștefan Burileanu =

Romanian officer, engineer, academic

- Born: 10 January 1874; Burila Mare village, Mehedinți County, Romania
- Died: 1944 (aged 69–70)
- Education: École Polytechnique, Saint-Cyr military school, Sorbonne
- Occupations: Officer, engineer, inventor, academic
- Years active: 1891–1944
- Employer: University of Cluj
- Known for: Contributions to Romanian anti-aircraft artillery
- Notable work: Conversion of Hotchkiss 57 mm Model 1888/1916 into anti-aircraft cannon
- Awards: Prize instituted by the Romanian Academy of Sciences

A 57 mm Burileanu anti-aircraft gun

Ștefan Burileanu (10 January 1874 – 1944) was a Romanian officer, engineer, inventor, and academic who rose to the rank of major general in 1933.

== Biography ==
Burileanu was born in Burila Mare village, Mehedinți County. He went to high school in Paris, graduating in 1891. From 1892 to 1894 he studied engineering and military science at École Polytechnique and from 1894–1896 at the Saint-Cyr military school in Fontainebleau. He completes his studies in France in 1901, earning a Ph.D. degree from the Sorbonne with a thesis titled Nouvelle méthode de balistique extérieure.

In 1915 he converted the Hotchkiss 57 mm Model 1888/1916 into an anti-aircraft cannon, designing a system which he named Burileanu. The 40 converted cannons had a rate of fire of 20-25 rounds per minute, a horizontal firing arc of 360° and a vertical arc of + 85°. Colonel Burileanu designed and built a special warhead for this cannon, increasing its range by 22%.

The cannon was widely used by the Romanian Army in World War I, bringing down German planes at Mărășești, Piatra Neamț, and Bârlad. He made a similar system for the Gruson 53 mm Model 1887/1916. He also contributed to the Romanian victory at the Battle of Mărășești through the modifications he made to its cannons and howitzers.

Between 1923 and 1930 Burileanu was a professor of mechanics at the University of Cluj. He was elected titular member of the Romanian Academy of Sciences (Military Section) on 21 December 1935.

Nowadays Burileanu is viewed as the father of the Romanian anti-aircraft artillery. In his memory, the Academy of Sciences has instituted a prize in his name. A street in Bucharest also bears his name. The Romanian Army's 30 km^{2} (12 sq mi) Test and Evaluation Center, located in Jegălia, Călărași County, is also named after General Burileanu.
