= Valea Popii =

Valea Popii may refer to several villages in Romania:

- Valea Popii, a village in Mihăești Commune, Argeș County
- Valea Popii, a village in Priboieni Commune, Argeș County
- Valea Popii, a village in Radovanu Commune, Călărași County
- Valea Popii, a village in Valea Călugărească Commune, Prahova County
- Valea Popii, a village in Todirești Commune, Vaslui County
