= Dorobanțu =

Dorobanțu may refer to places in Romania:

- Dorobanțu, Călărași, a commune in Călărași County
- Dorobanțu, Tulcea, a commune in Tulcea County
- Dorobanțu, a village in Nicolae Bălcescu Commune, Constanța County
- Dorobanțu, a village in Crângeni Commune, Teleorman County
