= Nucetu =

Nucetu may refer to several villages in Romania:

- Nucetu, a village in Lupșanu Commune, Călărași County
- Nucetu, a village in Negomir Commune, Gorj County
