= Virgil I. Bărbat =

Romanian sociologist (1879 - 1931)

Virgil Iuliu Bărbat (April 24, 1879—November 23, 1931) was a Romanian sociologist.

Born in Rasa, Călărași County, he graduated from Brăila's Nicolae Bălcescu High School in 1897, followed by the social sciences faculty of the University of Geneva, where he received his degree in 1905. Subsequently, he took courses on sociology, ethics and economics at Heidelberg and Leipzig. In 1909, he defended his thesis, in philosophy, at the University of Bern. Titled Nietzsche – tendances et problèmes, this was published at Zürich in 1911. After taking his doctorate, he remained abroad, embarking on a number of study trips. His destinations included Vienna, France, Germany, England, and the United States; his purpose was to study university education, social organization and cultural propaganda, and adapt these to conditions in his native country. In the early 1910s, he wrote frequently, and his contributions were largely found in the pages of Constantin Rădulescu-Motru's Noua Revistă Română. He returned to Romania in 1914, and was named English teacher at Mihai Viteazul and Spiru Haret high schools in the national capital Bucharest. In 1920, following the union of Transylvania with Romania and the revamping of the University of Cluj, he was named professor in its department of sociology and ethics. While there, he was able to apply the theories he had developed in his studies abroad. He was assistant professor during 1921-1922, then working as full professor until his premature death.

A prolific author, Bărbat penned articles and studies in sociology, pedagogy and politics in a number of magazines, both domestic and foreign, as well as books. Among his volumes of sociology are "Naționalism" sau "Democrație" ("'Nationalism' or 'Democracy'", 1911), a response to Aurel Popovici's Naționalism sau Democrație; Extensiunea Universitară ("The University Extension", 1926); Premisele umane ale culturii moderne ("The Human Premises of Modern Culture", 1927); Dinamism cultural ("Cultural Dynamism", 1928), and Exproprierea culturii ("The Expropriation of Culture", 1928). In 1924, he founded an institution he called the university extension, meant to bring culture to the masses and through which he intended to apply his plan for cultural politics. In 1931, he established Revista de sociologie, the only magazine devoted to sociology in interwar Cluj. By the 1920s, he was writing intensely for five or six journals, while the extension, centered on a group of prestigious Cluj professors who would hold lectures throughout Transylvania, including in isolated villages, managed to hold over 900 conferences in four years.
