= Dragoș Vodă =

Dragoş Vodă may refer to:

- Dragoș (died c. 1353), Moldavian ruler
- Dragoș Vodă, Călărași, Romanian commune
