= Răzoarele =

Răzoarele may refer to several villages in Romania:

- Răzoarele, a village in Ileana Commune, Călărași County
- Răzoarele, a village in Oltina Commune, Constanța County
