= Florența Albu =

Romanian poet (1934–2000)

Florența Albu (1 December 1934 – 3 February 2000) was a Romanian poet and journalist. She worked at the newspaper Scînteia Tineretului from 1963 to 1965, and then the journal Viața Românească for thirty years. She published more than ten volumes of poetry, and also wrote essays and travel notes.

== Biography ==
Florenta Albu was born in Floroaica, Călărași County on 1 December 1934. Ion and Maria Albu, her parents, were "wealthy peasants" (chiaburi), and her father was sent to a prison camp at Canal. Albu studied at the Gheorghe Șincai High School in Bucharest from 1948 to 1952, and then pursued her studies at the Faculty of Philology of the University of Bucharest, from 1952 to 1957. Her entry to the university was initially blocked as she had been unable to join the Uniunea Tineretului Muncitoresc (Union of Communist Youth) due to her family background. She worked at the Adesgo factory as an apprentice until she was able to enrol at the university. After university, Albu was unemployed for six years. Albu worked at the newspaper Scînteia Tineretului from 1963 to 1965; and the journal Viața Românească from 1965 to 1995, where she edited the poetry section Albu published more than ten volumes of poetry, and also wrote essays and travel notes. Albu wrote of Romanian places and people. Her debut volume was Fără popas (No rest), published in 1961, and "is dedicated to the wide plains of the Bărăgan and to the fishermen of the Danube delta".

Albu died in Bucharest at Fundeni Hospital in 2000, and was buried in Gruiu.

== Works ==
- Tânărul scriitor (1954)
- Fără popas, Editura pentru literatură, 1961
- Măşti de priveghi (1968)
- Arborele vieții (1971)
- Petrecere cu iarbă (1973)
- Elegii (1973)
- 65 poeme (1978)
- Kilometrul unu în cer (1988)
- "Himera nisipurilor, Roata lumii, Euri posibile". Streiflicht – Eine Auswahl zeitgenössischer rumänischer Lyrik (81 rumänische Autoren)
- "Lumina piezișă", translated Christian W. Schenk, Dionysos Verlag 1994, ISBN 3-9803871-1-9

=== English translations ===
- "LEFT–RIGHT...("STANG–DREPT…")", Centre for Romanian Studies, 11 July 2003
- "Bucharest Carol", Transcript Review, Vol 7

=== Non-fiction ===
- Câmpia soarelui 1962
