= Libertatea (disambiguation) =

Libertatea (Romanian for "Liberty") may refer to:

Media

- Libertatea, a Romanian daily tabloid established in 1989
- Libertatea (Serbia), a Romanian-language Serbian weekly based in Pančevo

Places

- Libertatea, a village in Călăraşi commune in Romania
- Libertatea, a village in Dichiseni commune in Romania
