= Vasilați =

- Commune
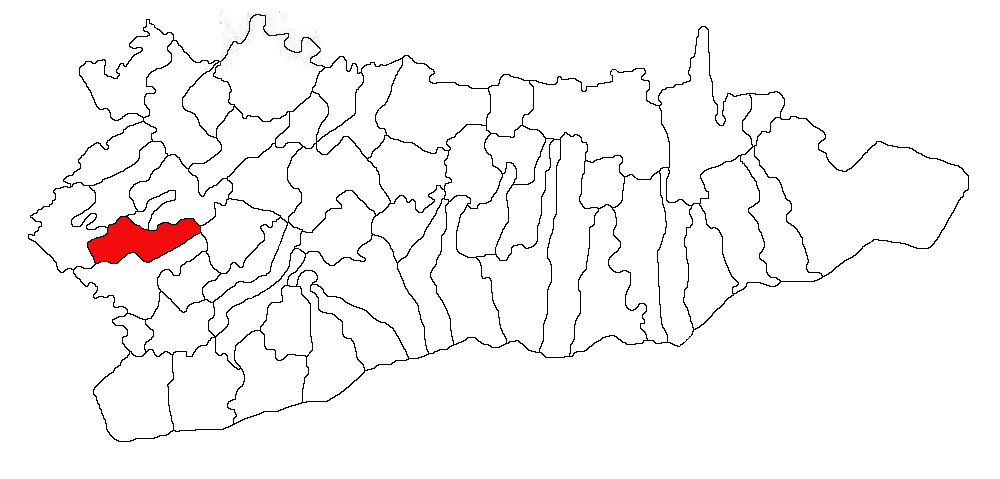
- Location in Călărași County

- Location in Romania
- Coordinates: 44°18′N 26°27′E
- Country: Romania
- County: Călărași

Government
  - Mayor (2024–2028): Cristian Vasile (PSD)
- Area: 73.02 km^{2} (28.19 sq mi)
- Elevation: 45 m (148 ft)
- Population (2021-12-01): 4,281
  - Density: 58.63/km^{2} (151.8/sq mi)
- Time zone: UTC+02:00 (EET)
  - Summer (DST): UTC+03:00 (EEST)
- Postal code: 917280
- Area code: +(40) 242
- Vehicle reg.: CL
- Website: primariavasilati.ro

Vasilați is a commune in Călărași County, Muntenia, Romania. It is composed of three villages: Nuci, Popești, and Vasilați. Gălbinași village belonged to Vasilați until 2005, when it was split off to form Gălbinași Commune.

Historical population
Year	Pop.	±%
2002	4,509	—
2011	4,389	−2.7%
2021	4,281	−2.5%
Source: Census data

== Natives ==
- Dinu Cristea (1911 – 1991), long-distance runner
