= Tămădău Mare =

- Commune
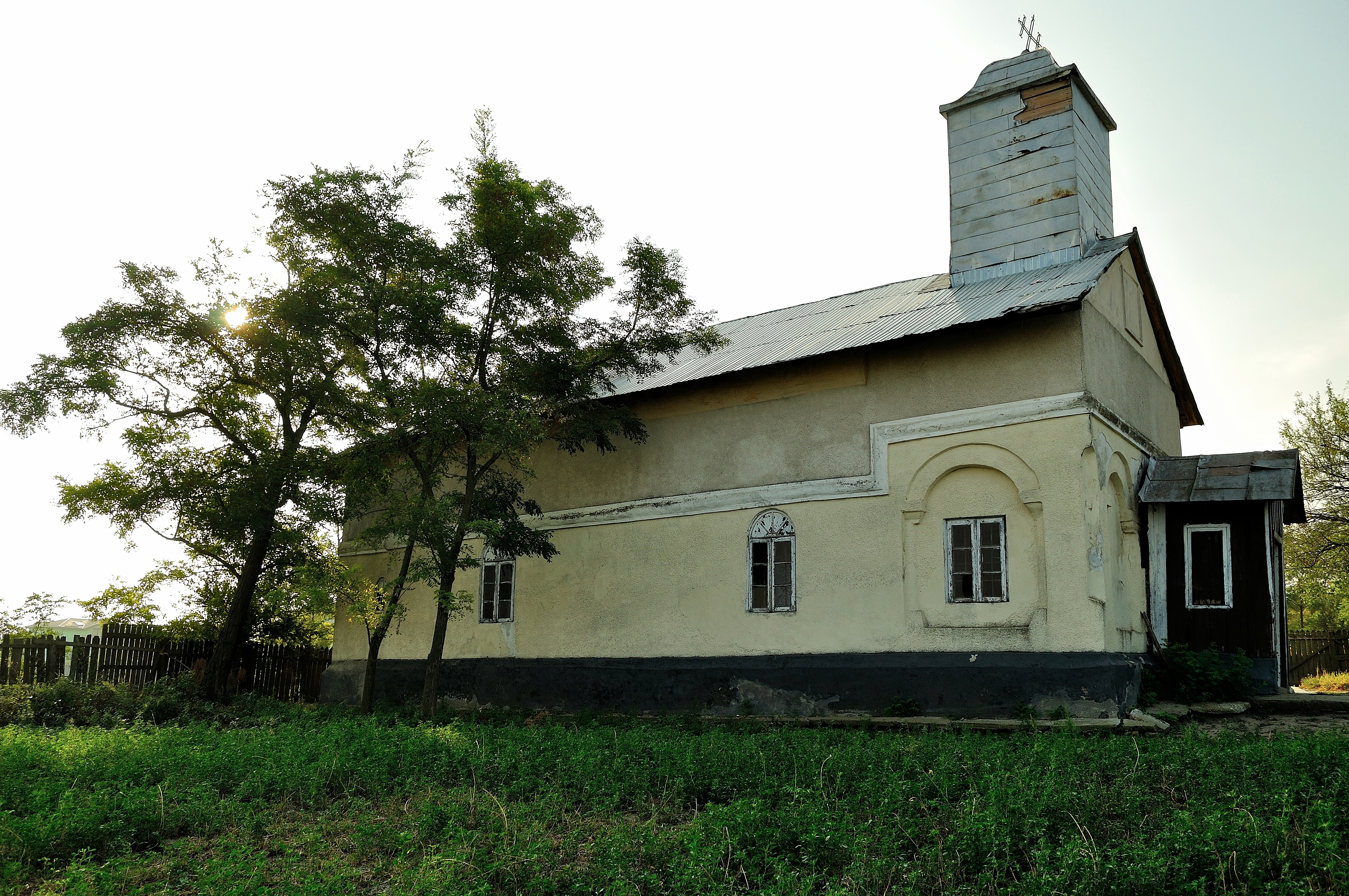
- Church in Tămădău Mic

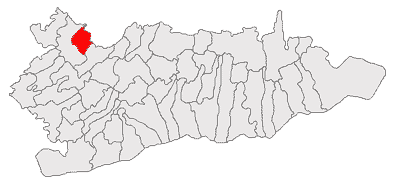
- Location in Călărași County

- Location in Romania
- Coordinates: 44°28′N 26°33′E
- Country: Romania
- County: Călărași

Government
  - Mayor (2024–2028): Constantin Chirică (PSD)
- Area: 41.48 km^{2} (16.02 sq mi)
- Elevation: 56 m (184 ft)
- Population (2021-12-01): 2,664
  - Density: 64.22/km^{2} (166.3/sq mi)
- Time zone: UTC+02:00 (EET)
  - Summer (DST): UTC+03:00 (EEST)
- Postal code: 917250
- Area code: +(40) 242
- Vehicle reg.: CL
- Website: www.primaria-tamadau.ro

Tămădău Mare is a commune in Călărași County, Muntenia, Romania. It is composed of seven villages: Călăreți, Dârvari, Plumbuita, Săcele, Șeinoiu, Tămădău Mare, and Tămădău Mic.

The military airfield located here was the scene of the Tămădău affair, which occurred on July 14, 1947.

Historical population
Year	Pop.	±%
2002	2,614	—
2011	2,640	+1.0%
2021	2,664	+0.9%
Source: Census data
