= Chiselet =

- Commune
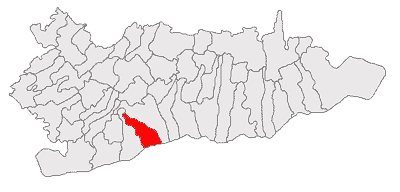
- Location in Călărași County

- Location in Romania
- Coordinates: 44°11′N 26°51′E
- Country: Romania
- County: Călărași

Government
  - Mayor (2020–2024): Mihail Penu (PNL)
- Area: 60.93 km^{2} (23.53 sq mi)
- Elevation: 17 m (56 ft)
- Population (2021-12-01): 3,104
  - Density: 50.94/km^{2} (131.9/sq mi)
- Time zone: UTC+02:00 (EET)
  - Summer (DST): UTC+03:00 (EEST)
- Postal code: 917030
- Area code: +(40) 242
- Vehicle reg.: CL
- Website: primariachiselet.ro

Chiselet is a commune in Călărași County, Muntenia, Romania. It is composed of a single village, Chiselet.

The commune is situated in the south of the Wallachian Plain, at an altitude of 17 m (56 ft), on the left bank of the Danube. A massive Neolithic tell called Măgura Fundeanca exists just a few kilometers south of the village center, towards the often flooded forest that borders the bank of the Danube.

Chiselet is located in the southern part of Călărași County, 25 km (16 mi) east of Oltenița and 44 km (27 mi) west of the county seat, Călărași. It is crossed by national road DN31, which connects the two cities.

Historical population
Year	Pop.	±%
2002	3,583	—
2011	3,392	−5.3%
2021	3,104	−8.5%
Source: Census data

As of the 2021 Romanian census, Chiselet had a population of 3,104; of those, 70.81% were Romanians and 23.26% Roma.
