= Ștefan Vodă, Călărași =

Ștefan Vodă
- Commune
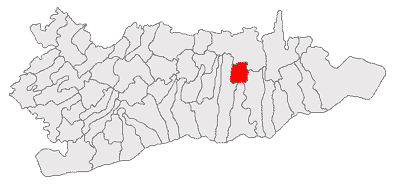
- Location in Călărași County

- Location in Romania
- Coordinates: 44°19′N 27°19′E
- Country: Romania
- County: Călărași

Government
  - Mayor (2024–2028): Ionel Zardova (PSD)
- Area: 69.06 km^{2} (26.66 sq mi)
- Elevation: 37 m (121 ft)
- Population (2021-12-01): 2,235
  - Density: 32.36/km^{2} (83.82/sq mi)
- Time zone: UTC+02:00 (EET)
  - Summer (DST): UTC+03:00 (EEST)
- Postal code: 917240
- Area code: +(40) 242
- Vehicle reg.: CL
- Website: comunastefanvoda.ro

Ștefan Vodă is a commune in Călărași County, Muntenia, Romania. It is composed of a single village, Ștefan Vodă.

Historical population
Year	Pop.	±%
2002	2,500	—
2011	2,270	−9.2%
2021	2,235	−1.5%
Source: Census data
