= Gurbănești =

- Commune
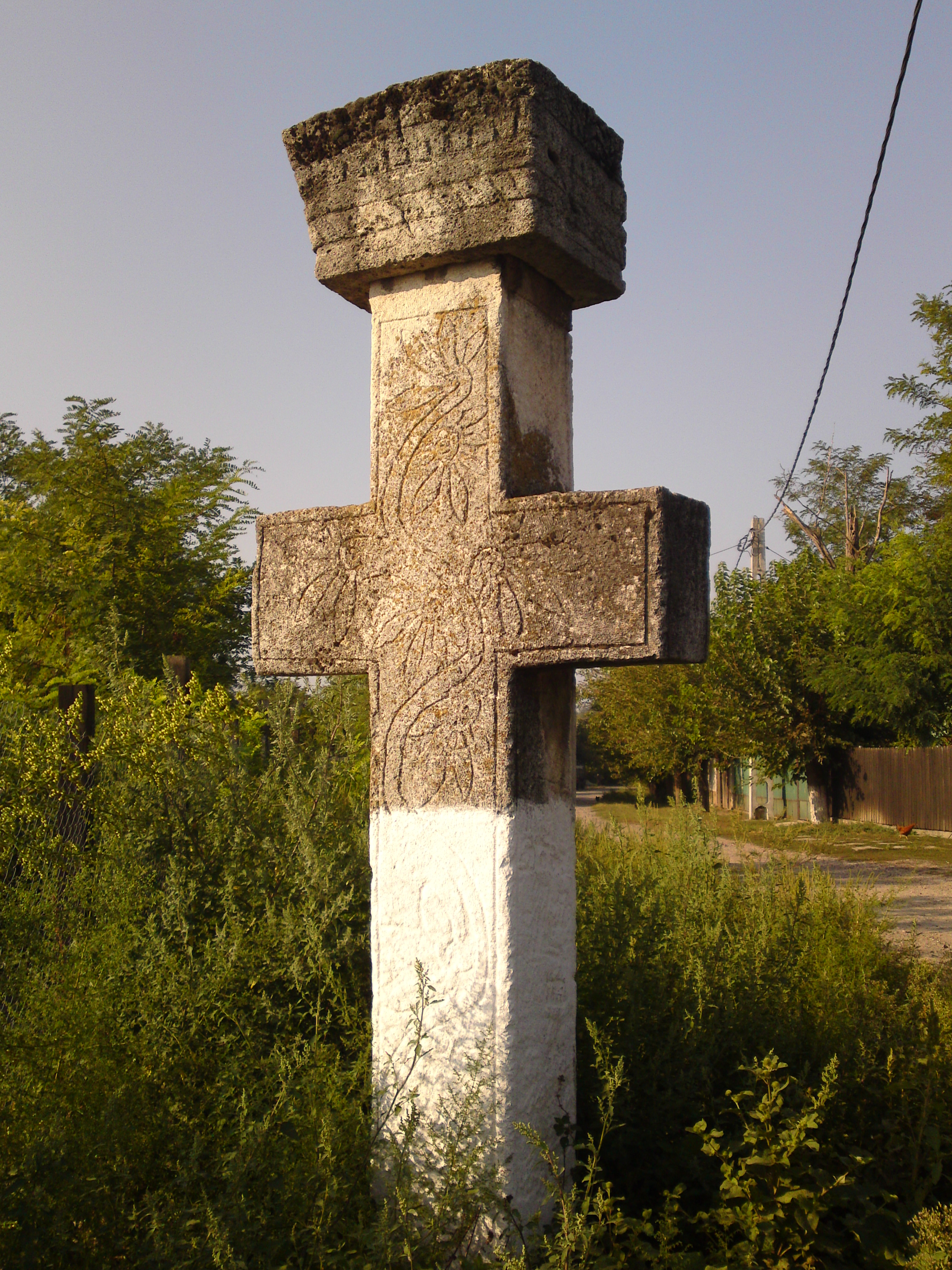
- Boundary cross in Coțofanca

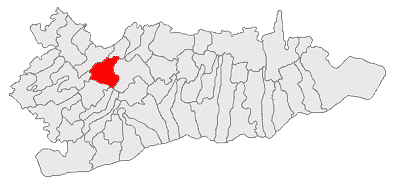
- Location in Călărași County

- Location in Romania
- Coordinates: 44°23′N 26°42′E
- Country: Romania
- County: Călărași

Government
  - Mayor (2024–2028): Sandu Manea (PSD)
- Area: 74.72 km^{2} (28.85 sq mi)
- Elevation: 30 m (98 ft)
- Population (2021-12-01): 1,148
  - Density: 15.36/km^{2} (39.79/sq mi)
- Time zone: UTC+02:00 (EET)
  - Summer (DST): UTC+03:00 (EEST)
- Postal code: 917120
- Area code: +(40) 242
- Vehicle reg.: CL
- Website: www.gurbanesti.ro

Gurbănești is a commune in Călărași County, Muntenia, Romania. It is composed of six villages: Codreni, Coțofanca, Gurbănești, Preasna, Preasna Veche, and Valea Presnei.

Historical population
Year	Pop.	±%
2002	1,662	—
2011	1,380	−17.0%
2021	1,148	−16.8%
Source: Census data
