= Ștefan cel Mare, Călărași =

Ștefan cel Mare
- Commune
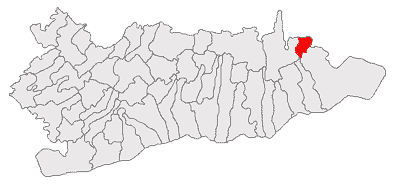
- Location in Călărași County

- Location in Romania
- Coordinates: 44°25′N 27°38′E
- Country: Romania
- County: Călărași

Government
  - Mayor (2024–2028): Nicolae Pandea (PNL)
- Area: 23.44 km^{2} (9.05 sq mi)
- Elevation: 37 m (121 ft)
- Population (2021-12-01): 3,146
  - Density: 134.2/km^{2} (347.6/sq mi)
- Time zone: UTC+02:00 (EET)
  - Summer (DST): UTC+03:00 (EEST)
- Postal code: 917245
- Area code: +(40) 242
- Vehicle reg.: CL
- Website: www.stefancelmarecl.ro

Ștefan cel Mare is a commune in Călărași County, Muntenia, Romania. It is composed of a single village, Ștefan cel Mare.

Historical population
| Year | Pop. | ±% |
|---|---|---|
| 2002 | 3,261 | — |
| 2011 | 3,236 | −0.8% |
| 2021 | 3,146 | −2.8% |
Source: Census data
