= Plătărești =

- Commune
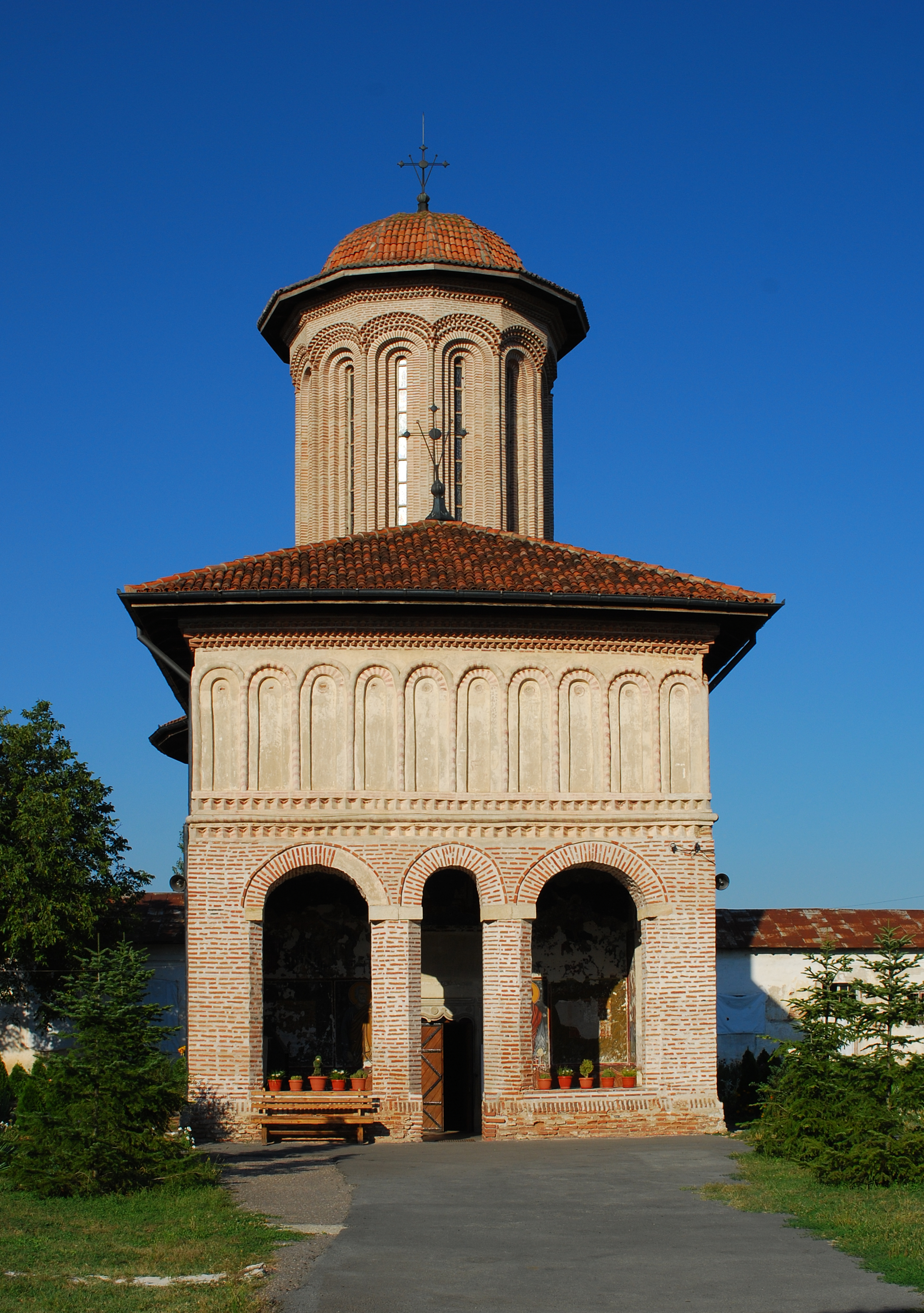
- Plătărești Monastery church

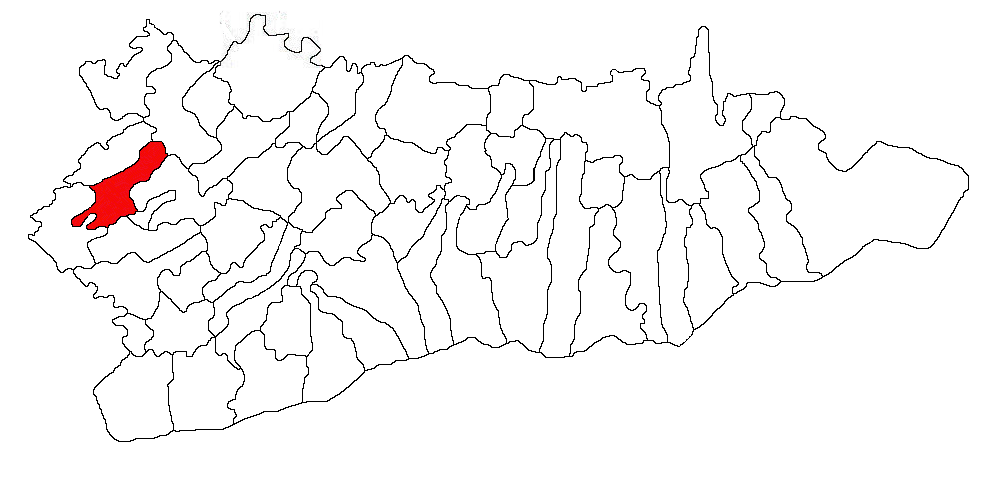
- Location in Călărași County

- Location in Romania
- Coordinates: 44°21′N 26°22′E
- Country: Romania
- County: Călărași

Government
  - Mayor (2024–2028): Sorin Adrian Ene (PSD)
- Area: 50.12 km^{2} (19.35 sq mi)
- Elevation: 50 m (160 ft)
- Population (2021-12-01): 3,955
  - Density: 78.91/km^{2} (204.4/sq mi)
- Time zone: UTC+02:00 (EET)
  - Summer (DST): UTC+03:00 (EEST)
- Postal code: 917200
- Area code: +40 x42
- Vehicle reg.: CL
- Website: primaria-plataresti.ro

Plătărești is a commune in Călărași County, Muntenia, Romania. It is composed of four villages: Cucuieți, Dorobanțu, Plătărești, and Podu Pitarului.

The commune is located in the southwestern reaches of the Bărăgan Plain, in the western part of the county.

Historical population
Year	Pop.	±%
2002	4,317	—
2011	4,178	−3.2%
2021	3,955	−5.3%
Source: Census data

At the 2011 census, Plătărești had a population of 4,178; of those, 88.61% were ethnic Romanians and 4.14% Roma. At the 2021 census, the commune had a population of 3,955, of which 87.64% were Romanians and 6.93% Roma.

Plătărești Monastery was built in 1632–1646 by Voivode Matei Basarab.

== Natives ==
- Mihail Dragomirescu (1868 – 1942), aesthetician, literary theorist, and critic.
