= Vâlcelele, Călărași =

Vâlcelele
- Commune
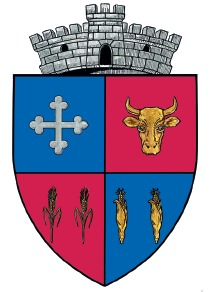
- Coat of arms

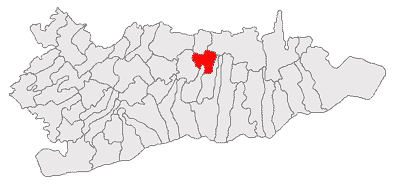
- Location in Călărași County

- Location in Romania
- Coordinates: 44°23′N 27°10′E
- Country: Romania
- County: Călărași

Government
  - Mayor (2024–2028): Ionel Tatu (PSD)
- Elevation: 39 m (128 ft)
- Population (2021-12-01): 1,665
- Time zone: UTC+02:00 (EET)
  - Summer (DST): UTC+03:00 (EEST)
- Postal code: 917290
- Area code: +(40) 242
- Vehicle reg.: CL
- Website: primariavilcelele.ro

Vâlcelele is a commune in Călărași County, Muntenia, Romania. It is composed of two villages, Vâlcelele and Floroaica.

Historical population
Year	Pop.	±%
2002	2,081	—
2011	1,863	−10.5%
2021	1,665	−10.6%
Source: Census data

== Natives ==
- Florența Albu (1934–2000), poet
