= Gălbinași, Călărași =

Gălbinași
- Commune
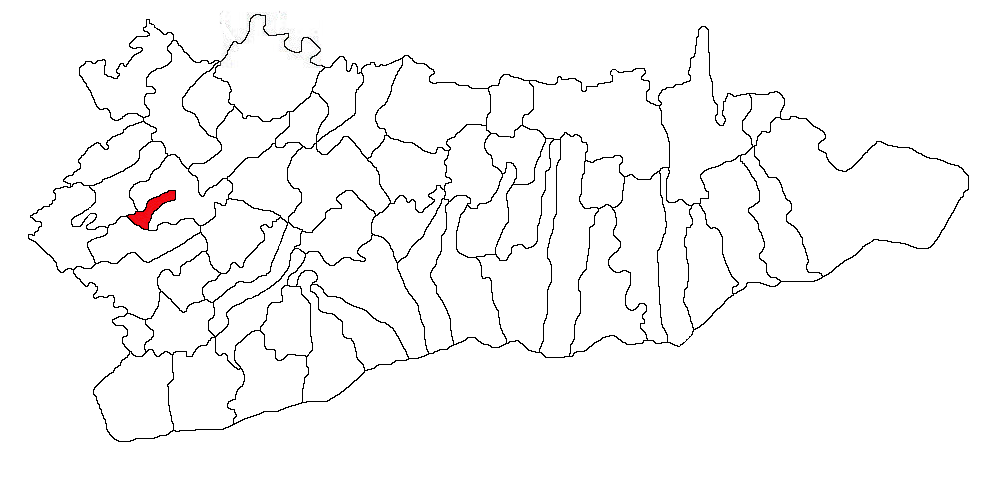
- Location in Călărași County

- Location in Romania
- Coordinates: 44°19′N 26°25′E
- Country: Romania
- County: Călărași

Government
  - Mayor (2024–2028): Paul Radu (PSD)
- Area: 25.72 km^{2} (9.93 sq mi)
- Elevation: 44 m (144 ft)
- Population (2021-12-01): 3,704
  - Density: 144.0/km^{2} (373.0/sq mi)
- Time zone: UTC+02:00 (EET)
  - Summer (DST): UTC+03:00 (EEST)
- Postal code: 917285
- Area code: +(40) 242
- Vehicle reg.: CL
- Website: primaria-galbinasi.ro

Gălbinași is a commune in Călărași County, Muntenia, Romania. It is composed of a single village, Gălbinași. It was a village of Vasilați Commune until 2005, when it was split off to form a separate commune.

Historical population
| Year | Pop. | ±% |
|---|---|---|
| 2002 | 3,434 | — |
| 2011 | 3,772 | +9.8% |
| 2021 | 3,704 | −1.8% |
Source: Census data

At the 2011 census, the population of Gălbinași was 3,772. At the 2021 census, the commune had a population of 3,704.
