= Spanțov =

- Commune
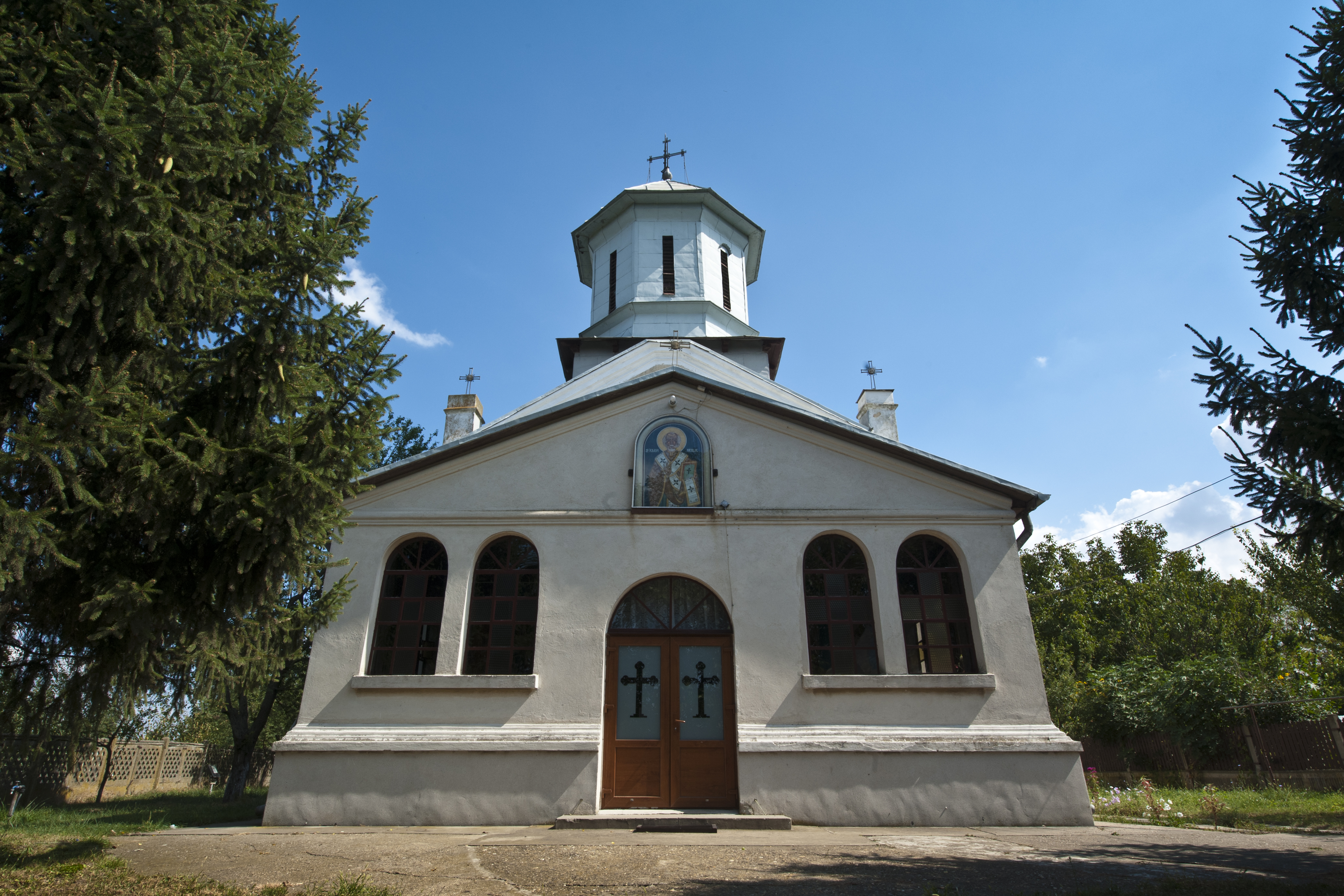
- Saint Nicholas Church in Spanțov

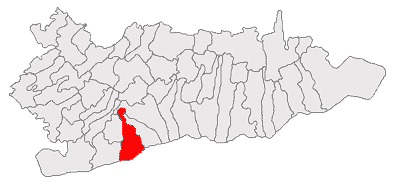
- Location in Călărași County

- Location in Romania
- Coordinates: 44°07′N 26°47′E
- Country: Romania
- County: Călărași

Government
  - Mayor (2024–2028): Silviu-Niki Gheorghescu (PNL)
- Area: 44.4 km^{2} (17.1 sq mi)
- Elevation: 17 m (56 ft)
- Population (2021-12-01): 4,595
  - Density: 103/km^{2} (268/sq mi)
- Time zone: UTC+02:00 (EET)
  - Summer (DST): UTC+03:00 (EEST)
- Postal code: 917230
- Area code: +40 x42
- Vehicle reg.: CL
- Website: www.comunaspantov.ro

Spanțov is a commune in Călărași County, Muntenia, Romania. It is composed of three villages: Cetatea Veche, Spanțov, and Stancea.

The commune lies on the left bank of the Danube River, in the southern reaches of the Bărăgan Plain. It is located in the southwestern part of Călărași County, on the border with Bulgaria. It is traversed by national road DN31, which connects it to Oltenița, 17 km (11 mi) to the east, and to the county seat, Călărași, 52 km (32 mi) to the west.

Historical population
Year	Pop.	±%
2002	4,681	—
2011	4,605	−1.6%
2021	4,595	−0.2%
Source: Census data

At the 2011 census, Spanțov had a population of 4,605; of those, 64.04% were ethnic Romanians and 31.25% Roma. At the 2021 census, the commune had a population of 4,595, of which 88.4% were Romanians and 6.62% Roma.

== Natives ==
- Aurel Mihale (1922 – 2007), prose writer
