= Crivăț, Călărași =

Crivăț
- Commune
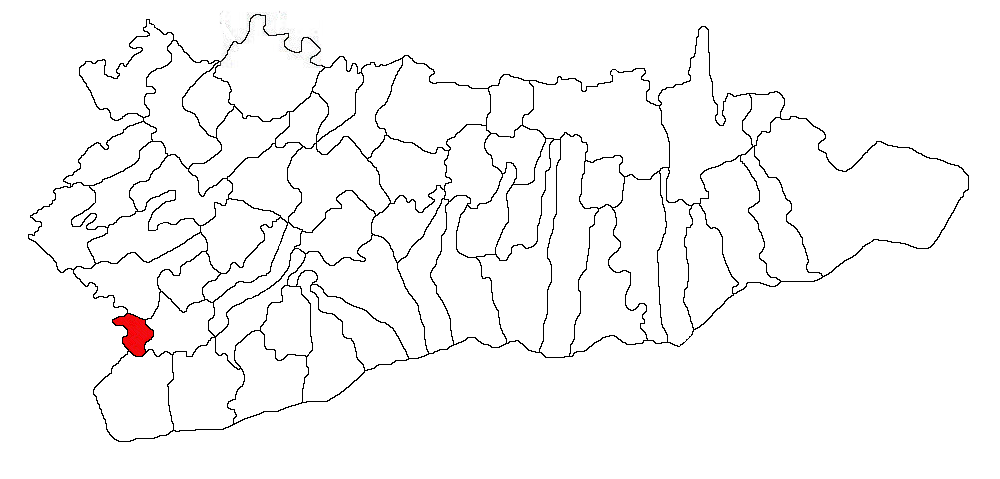
- Location in Călărași County

- Location in Romania
- Coordinates: 44°12′N 26°26′E
- Country: Romania
- County: Călărași

Government
  - Mayor (2024–2028): Ion Catană (PSD)
- Area: 24.26 km^{2} (9.37 sq mi)
- Elevation: 31 m (102 ft)
- Population (2021-12-01): 1,956
  - Density: 80.63/km^{2} (208.8/sq mi)
- Time zone: UTC+02:00 (EET)
  - Summer (DST): UTC+03:00 (EEST)
- Postal code: 915103
- Area code: +(40) 242
- Vehicle reg.: CL
- Website: www.comunacrivat.ro

Crivăț is a commune in west side of Călărași County, Muntenia, Romania, composed of a single village, Crivăț. It was administered by Budești town until 2006, when it received commune status.

Historical population
Year	Pop.	±%
2002	2,412	—
2011	2,243	−7.0%
2021	1,956	−12.8%
Source: Census data
