= Mitreni =

- Commune
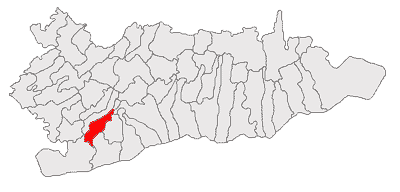
- Location in Călărași County

- Location in Romania
- Coordinates: 44°10′N 26°36′E
- Country: Romania
- County: Călărași

Government
  - Mayor (2024–2028): Ciprian Constantin Panait (PNL)
- Area: 51.18 km^{2} (19.76 sq mi)
- Elevation: 27 m (89 ft)
- Population (2021-12-01): 3,730
  - Density: 72.9/km^{2} (189/sq mi)
- Time zone: UTC+02:00 (EET)
  - Summer (DST): UTC+03:00 (EEST)
- Postal code: 917175
- Area code: +(40) 242
- Vehicle reg.: CL
- Website: primariamitreni.ro

Mitreni is a commune in Călărași County, Muntenia, Romania. It is composed of three villages: Clătești, Mitreni, and Valea Roșie.

Historical population
Year	Pop.	±%
2002	4,898	—
2011	4,323	−11.7%
2021	3,730	−13.7%
Source: Census data
