= Perișoru =

- Commune
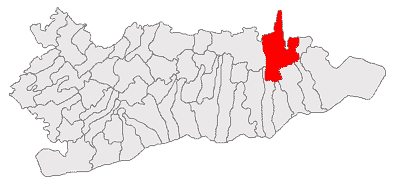
- Location in Călărași County

- Location in Romania
- Coordinates: 44°27′N 27°33′E
- Country: Romania
- County: Călărași

Government
  - Mayor (2024–2028): Ionel-Cătălin Bucur (PSD)
- Area: 213.46 km^{2} (82.42 sq mi)
- Elevation: 35 m (115 ft)
- Population (2021-12-01): 4,705
  - Density: 22.04/km^{2} (57.09/sq mi)
- Time zone: UTC+02:00 (EET)
  - Summer (DST): UTC+03:00 (EEST)
- Postal code: 917195
- Area code: +40 x42
- Vehicle reg.: CL
- Website: www.comunaperisoru.ro

Perișoru is a commune in Călărași County, Muntenia, Romania. It is composed of three villages: Mărculești-Gară, Perișoru, and Tudor Vladimirescu. As of 2021 the population of Perișoru was 4,705.

The commune is situated in the Bărăgan Plain, a steppe plain in the eastern part of the Wallachian Plain. It is located in the northeastern part of the county, 42 km (26 mi) from the county seat, Călărași, on the border with Ialomița County.

Perișoru is crossed by national road DN3A, which connects the town of Lehliu Gară, 64 km (40 mi) to the west, with the city of Fetești, 24 km (15 mi) to the east. The A2 motorway, which links Bucharest to Constanța, passes through the southern outskirts of the commune. The Perișoru train station serves the CFR Main Line 800, connecting Bucharest with the Black Sea coast.

Historical population
Year	Pop.	±%
2002	5,596	—
2011	5,114	−8.6%
2021	4,705	−8.0%
Source: Census data
