= Cuza Vodă, Călărași =

Cuza Vodă
- Commune
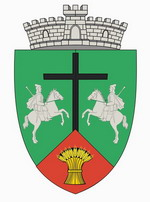
- Coat of arms

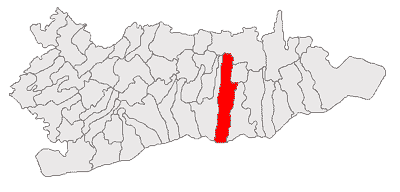
- Location in Călărași County

- Location in Romania
- Coordinates: 44°16′N 27°15′E
- Country: Romania
- County: Călărași

Government
  - Mayor (2024–2028): Monica-Silvia Ceaușescu (PNL)
- Area: 140.5 km^{2} (54.2 sq mi)
- Elevation: 17 m (56 ft)
- Population (2021-12-01): 4,116
  - Density: 29.30/km^{2} (75.87/sq mi)
- Time zone: UTC+02:00 (EET)
  - Summer (DST): UTC+03:00 (EEST)
- Postal code: 917045
- Area code: +(40) x42
- Vehicle reg.: CL
- Website: primariacuzavoda.ro

Cuza Vodă is a commune in Călărași County, Muntenia, Romania. It is composed of three villages: Cuza Vodă, Ceacu, and Călărașii Vechi. At the 2021 census, Cuza Vodă had a population of 4,116.

Historical population
Year	Pop.	±%
2002	4,352	—
2011	4,045	−7.1%
2021	4,116	+1.8%
Source: Census data
