= Chirnogi =

- Commune
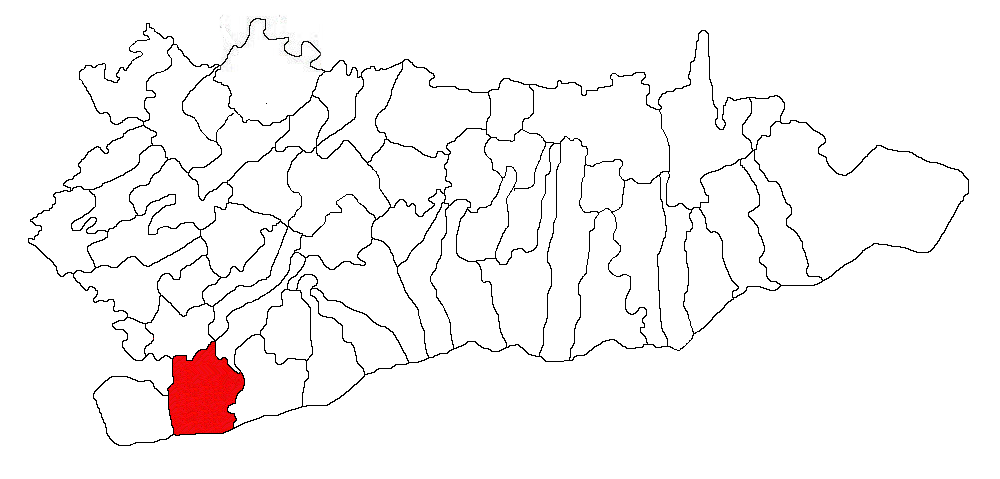
- Location in Călărași County

- Location in Romania
- Coordinates: 44°7′N 26°35′E
- Country: Romania
- County: Călărași

Government
  - Mayor (2024–2028): Ion Ștefan (PSD)
- Area: 198.95 km^{2} (76.82 sq mi)
- Elevation: 18 m (59 ft)
- Population (2021-12-01): 6,629
  - Density: 33.32/km^{2} (86.30/sq mi)
- Time zone: UTC+02:00 (EET)
  - Summer (DST): UTC+03:00 (EEST)
- Postal code: 917025
- Area code: +(40) 242
- Vehicle reg.: CL
- Website: comunachirnogi.ro

Chirnogi is a commune in Călărași County, Muntenia, Romania. It is composed of a single village, Chirnogi.

The commune is situated in the south of the Wallachian Plain, at an altitude of 18 m (59 ft), on the left bank of the Danube, where the Argeș River discharges into it. Chirnogi is located towards the southwestern extremity of Călărași County, 7 km (4.3 mi) west of Oltenița. It is crossed by national road DN41, which connects Oltenița to Giurgiu.

Historical population
Year	Pop.	±%
2002	8,136	—
2011	7,455	−8.4%
2021	6,629	−11.1%
Source: Census data

At the 2021 census, Chirnogi had a population of 6,629; of those, 70.07% were Romanians and 20.14% Roma.
