= Ulmeni, Călărași =

Ulmeni
- Commune
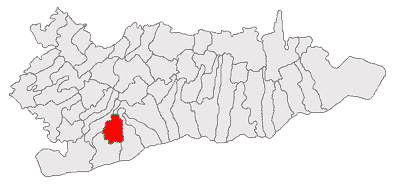
- Location in Călărași County

- Location in Romania
- Coordinates: 44°9′N 26°43′E
- Country: Romania
- County: Călărași

Government
  - Mayor (2024–2028): Narcis Niculae Drăgnoi (PSD)
- Area: 55.34 km^{2} (21.37 sq mi)
- Elevation: 25 m (82 ft)
- Population (2021-12-01): 4,543
  - Density: 82.09/km^{2} (212.6/sq mi)
- Time zone: UTC+02:00 (EET)
  - Summer (DST): UTC+03:00 (EEST)
- Postal code: 917260
- Area code: +(40) 242
- Vehicle reg.: CL
- Website: www.primariaulmeni.ro

Ulmeni is a commune in Călărași County, Muntenia, Romania. It is composed of a single village, Ulmeni.

Historical population
Year	Pop.	±%
2002	5,378	—
2011	4,962	−7.7%
2021	4,543	−8.4%
Source: Census data
