= Grădiștea, Călărași =

Grădiștea
- Commune
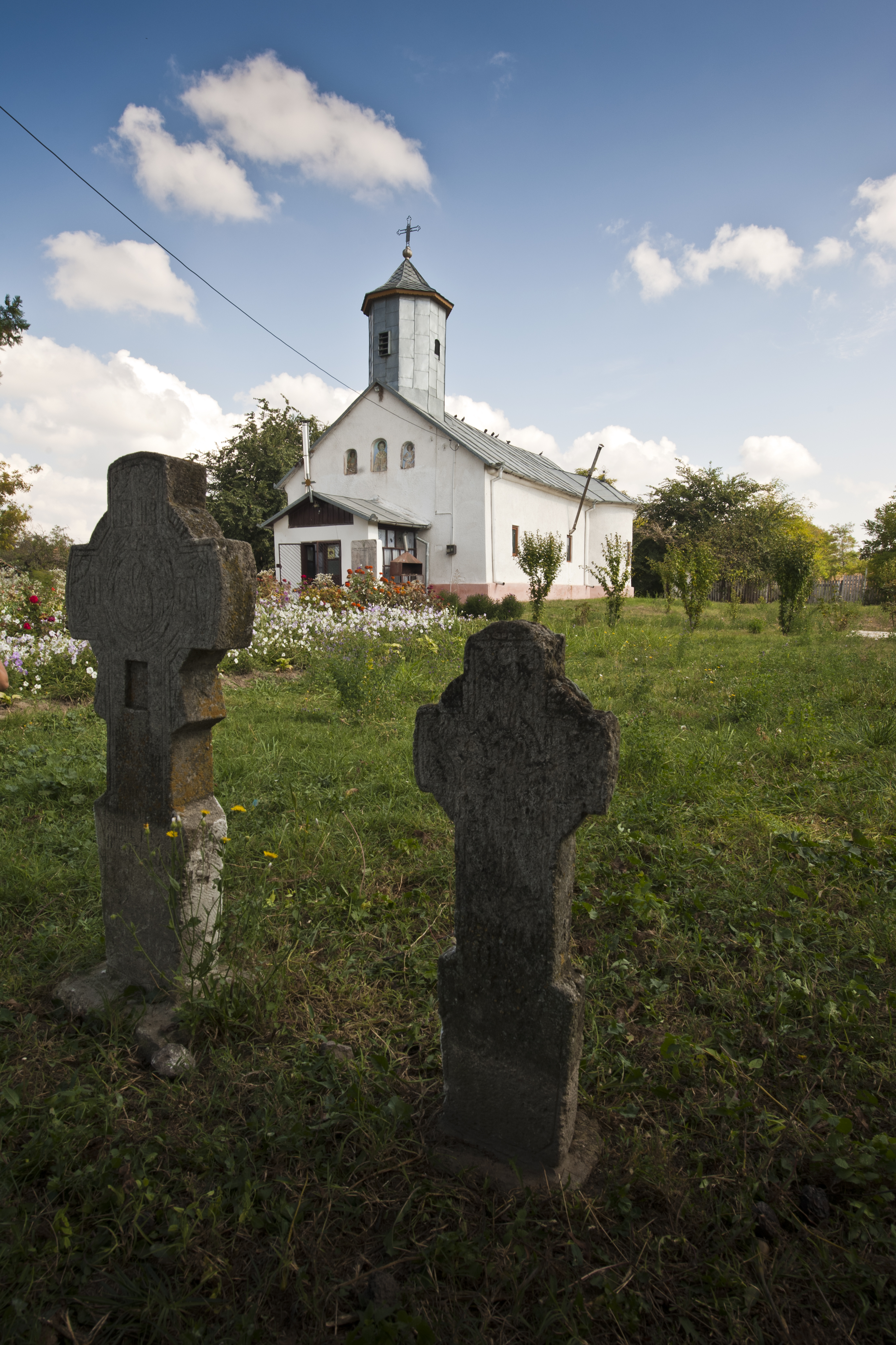
- St. Nicholas Church in Bogata

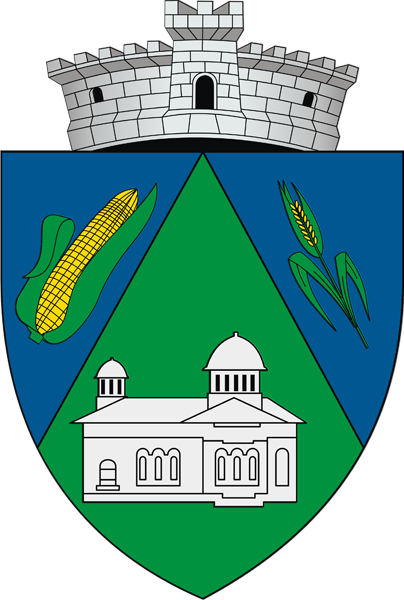
- Coat of arms

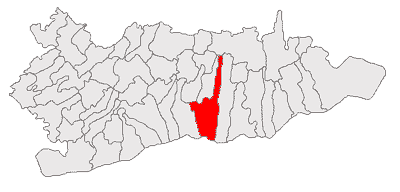
- Location in Călărași County

- Location in Romania
- Coordinates: 44°8′N 26°45′E
- Country: Romania
- County: Călărași

Government
  - Mayor (2024–2028): Vasile Matei (PSD)
- Area: 177.39 km^{2} (68.49 sq mi)
- Elevation: 20 m (66 ft)
- Population (2021-12-01): 4,499
  - Density: 25.36/km^{2} (65.69/sq mi)
- Time zone: UTC+02:00 (EET)
  - Summer (DST): UTC+03:00 (EEST)
- Postal code: 917115
- Area code: +(40) 242
- Vehicle reg.: CL
- Website: www.primariagradistea.ro

Grădiștea is a commune in Călărași County, Muntenia, Romania. It is composed of four villages: Bogata, Cunești, Grădiștea, and Rasa. At the 2021 census, Grădiștea had a population of 4,499.

Historical population
Year	Pop.	±%
2002	5,301	—
2011	4,853	−8.5%
2021	4,499	−7.3%
Source: Census data

== Natives ==
- Virgil I. Bărbat (1879—1931), sociologist
