= Radovanu =

- Commune
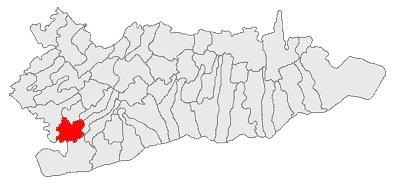
- Location in Călărași County

- Location in Romania
- Coordinates: 44°12′N 26°31′E
- Country: Romania
- County: Călărași

Government
  - Mayor (2024–2028): Vasilica Dobrescu (PNL)
- Area: 59.08 km^{2} (22.81 sq mi)
- Elevation: 28 m (92 ft)
- Population (2021-12-01): 3,695
  - Density: 62.54/km^{2} (162.0/sq mi)
- Time zone: UTC+02:00 (EET)
  - Summer (DST): UTC+03:00 (EEST)
- Postal code: 917205
- Area code: +(40) 242
- Vehicle reg.: CL
- Website: www.primaria-radovanu.ro

Radovanu is a commune in Călărași County, Muntenia, Romania. It is composed of two villages, Radovanu and Valea Popii.

Historical population
Year	Pop.	±%
2002	5,136	—
2011	4,394	−14.4%
2021	3,695	−15.9%
Source: Census data

As of the 2021 census, the population of Radovanu was 3,695.
