= Ulmu, Călărași =

Ulmu
- Commune
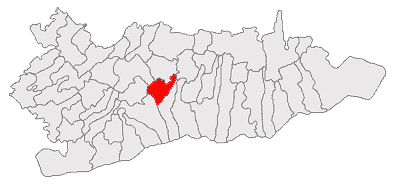
- Location in Călărași County

- Location in Romania
- Coordinates: 44°16′N 26°55′E
- Country: Romania
- County: Călărași

Government
  - Mayor (2024–2028): Ion Negoiță (PSD)
- Elevation: 25 m (82 ft)
- Population (2021-12-01): 1,345
- Time zone: UTC+02:00 (EET)
  - Summer (DST): UTC+03:00 (EEST)
- Postal code: 917265
- Area code: +(40) 242
- Vehicle reg.: CL
- Website: ulmucalarasi.ro

Ulmu is a commune in Călărași County, Muntenia, Romania. It is composed of four villages: Chirnogi, Făurei, Ulmu, and Zimbru.

Historical population
Year	Pop.	±%
2002	1,953	—
2011	1,561	−20.1%
2021	1,345	−13.8%
Source: Census data
