= Nana, Călărași =

Nana
- Commune
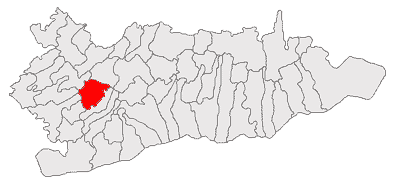
- Location in Călărași County

- Location in Romania
- Coordinates: 44°16′N 26°35′E
- Country: Romania
- County: Călărași

Government
  - Mayor (2024–2028): Gheorghe Dobre (PSD)
- Area: 74.5 km^{2} (28.8 sq mi)
- Elevation: 38 m (125 ft)
- Population (2021-12-01): 2,284
  - Density: 30.7/km^{2} (79.4/sq mi)
- Time zone: UTC+02:00 (EET)
  - Summer (DST): UTC+03:00 (EEST)
- Postal code: 917185
- Area code: +(40) 242
- Vehicle reg.: CL
- Website: www.primaria-nana.ro

Nana is a commune in Călărași County, Muntenia, Romania. It is composed of a single village, Nana.

Historical population
Year	Pop.	±%
2002	2,641	—
2011	2,568	−2.8%
2021	2,284	−11.1%
Source: Census data

At the 2021 census, Nana has a population of 2,284.
