= Sohatu =

- Commune
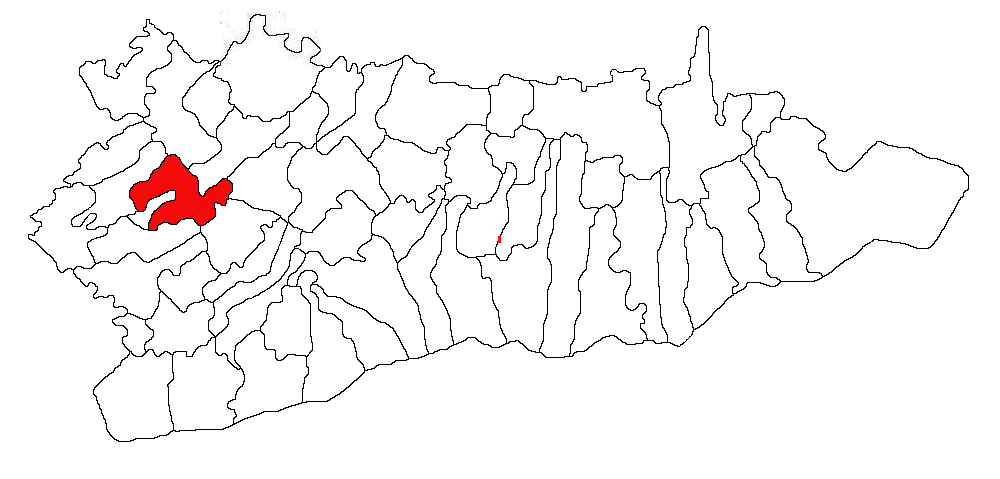
- Location in Călărași County

- Location in Romania
- Coordinates: 44°19′N 26°30′E
- Country: Romania
- County: Călărași

Government
  - Mayor (2024–2028): Cătălin Iordache (PNL)
- Area: 84.17 km^{2} (32.50 sq mi)
- Elevation: 52 m (171 ft)
- Population (2021-12-01): 2,650
  - Density: 31.5/km^{2} (81.5/sq mi)
- Time zone: UTC+02:00 (EET)
  - Summer (DST): UTC+03:00 (EEST)
- Postal code: 917225
- Area code: +(40) 242
- Vehicle reg.: CL
- Website: primariasohatu.ro

Sohatu is a commune in Călărași County, Muntenia, Romania. It is composed of two villages, Sohatu and Progresu.

Historical population
Year	Pop.	±%
2002	3,478	—
2011	3,240	−6.8%
2021	2,650	−18.2%
Source: Census data

At the 2002 census, the population of Sohatu was 3,478. At the 2021 census, the commune had a population of 2,650; of those, 88.34% were Romanians and 4.49% Roma.

== Natives ==
- Constanța Burcică (born 1971), Olympic rower
