= Alexandru Odobescu, Călărași =

Alexandru Odobescu
- Commune
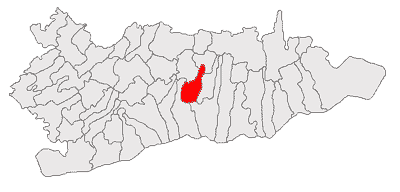
- Location in Călărași County

- Location in Romania
- Coordinates: 44°16′N 27°5′E
- Country: Romania
- County: Călărași

Government
  - Mayor (2024–2028): Niculae Eremia (PNL)
- Area: 58.79 km^{2} (22.70 sq mi)
- Elevation: 37 m (121 ft)
- Population (2021-12-01): 2,737
  - Density: 46.56/km^{2} (120.6/sq mi)
- Time zone: UTC+02:00 (EET)
  - Summer (DST): UTC+03:00 (EEST)
- Postal code: 917007
- Area code: +(40) 242
- Vehicle reg.: CL
- Website: primariaodobescu.ro

Alexandru Odobescu is a commune in Călărași County, Muntenia, Romania. It is composed of three villages: Alexandru Odobescu, Nicolae Bălcescu (the commune center), and Gălățui.

Historical population
Year	Pop.	±%
2002	3,103	—
2011	2,816	−9.2%
2021	2,737	−2.8%
Source: Census data

At the 2021 census, the population of the commune was 2,737.
