= Curcani =

- Commune
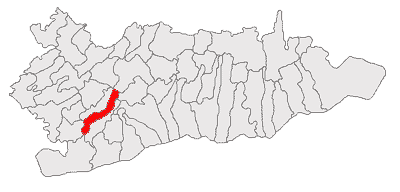
- Location in Călărași County

- Location in Romania
- Coordinates: 44°12′N 26°35′E
- Country: Romania
- County: Călărași
- Established: 24 September 1878 (first attested)

Government
  - Mayor (2024–2028): Aurel Bogdan Popa (PNL)
- Area: 55.2 km^{2} (21.3 sq mi)
- Elevation: 27 m (89 ft)
- Population (2021-12-01): 5,301
  - Density: 96.0/km^{2} (249/sq mi)
- Time zone: UTC+02:00 (EET)
  - Summer (DST): UTC+03:00 (EEST)
- Postal code: 917040
- Area code: +(40) 242
- Vehicle reg.: CL
- Website: www.primariacurcani.ro

Curcani is a commune in Călărași County, Muntenia, Romania. It is composed of two villages, Curcani and Sălcioara.

Historical population
| Year | Pop. | ±% |
|---|---|---|
| 2002 | 5,233 | — |
| 2011 | 5,672 | +8.4% |
| 2021 | 5,301 | −6.5% |
Source: Census data

At the 2002 census, there were 5,233 inhabitants. Of these, 65.8% were ethnic Romanians and 34.1% Roma; 99.6% were Romanian Orthodox. At the 2021 census, Curcani had had a population of 5,301; of thise, 62.03% were Romanians and 25.92% Roma.

The commune's name, meaning "turkeys", was bestowed in the aftermath of the Romanian War of Independence, and refers to a nickname given to Dorobanți troops.
