= Ileana, Călărași =

Ileana
- Commune
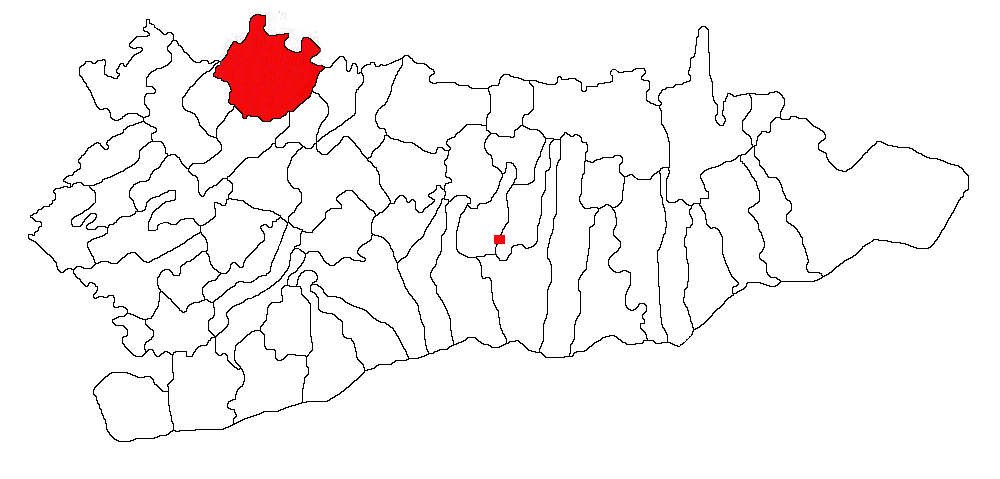
- Location in Călărași County

- Location in Romania
- Coordinates: 44°31′N 26°39′E
- Country: Romania
- County: Călărași

Government
  - Mayor (2024–2028): Răzvan Alexandru (PSD)
- Area: 118.66 km^{2} (45.81 sq mi)
- Elevation: 55 m (180 ft)
- Population (2021-12-01): 3,236
  - Density: 27.27/km^{2} (70.63/sq mi)
- Time zone: UTC+02:00 (EET)
  - Summer (DST): UTC+03:00 (EEST)
- Postal code: 917130
- Area code: +(40) 242
- Vehicle reg.: CL
- Website: www.comunaileana.ro

Ileana is a commune in Călărași County, Muntenia, Romania. It is composed of nine villages: Arțari, Florica, Ileana, Podari, Răsurile, Răzoarele, Satu Nou, Ștefănești, and Vlăiculești.

Historical population
Year	Pop.	±%
2002	3,872	—
2011	3,702	−4.4%
2021	3,236	−12.6%
Source: Census data

At the 2011 census, the population of Ileana was 3,702. At the 2021 census, the commune's population had decreased to 3,236.
