= Frăsinet, Călărași =

Frăsinet
- Commune
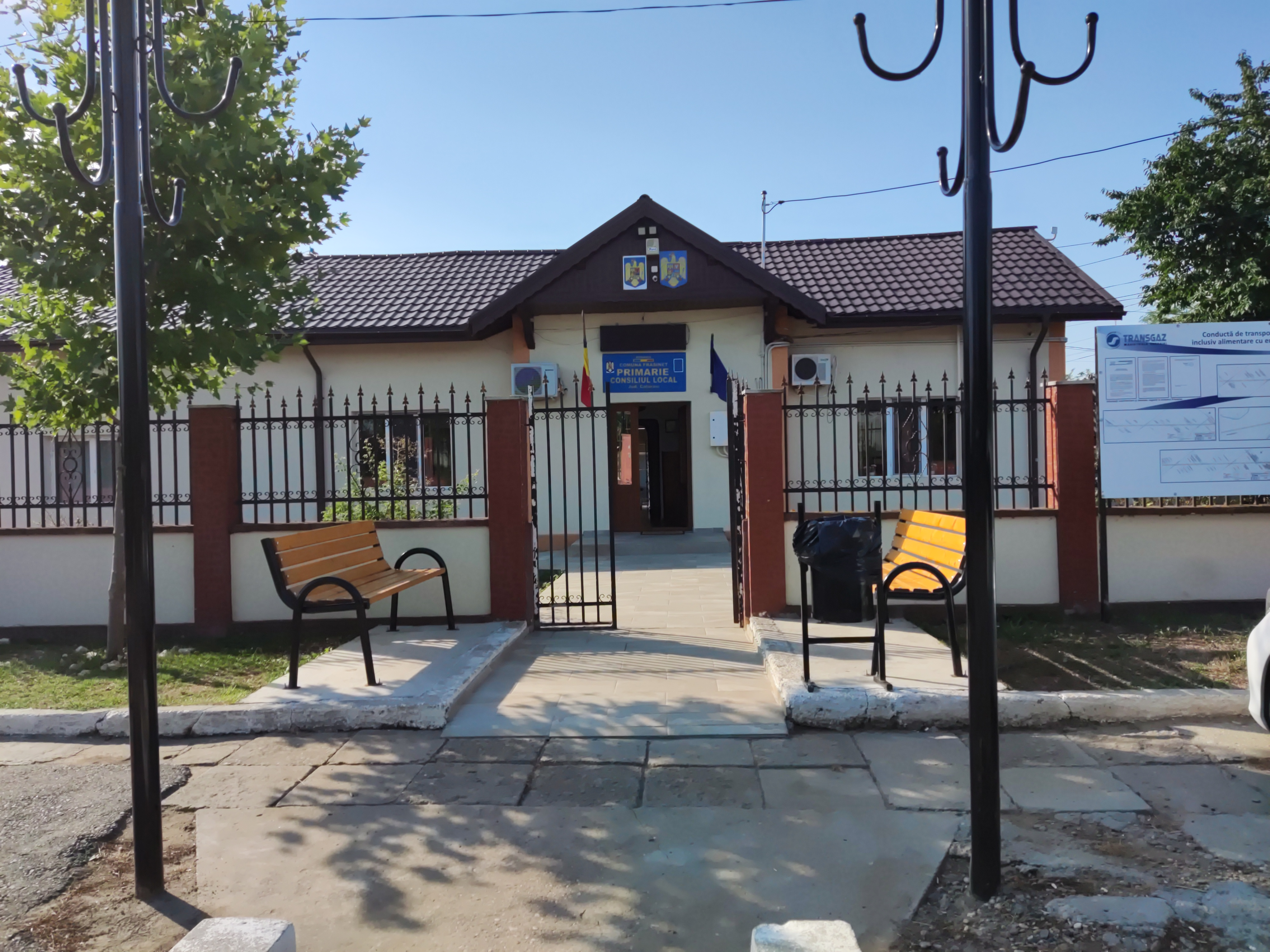
- Frăsinet town hall

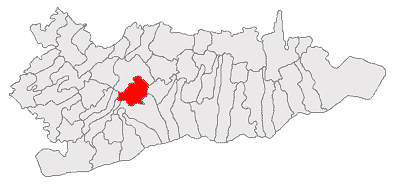
- Location in Călărași County

- Location in Romania
- Coordinates: 44°16′N 26°52′E
- Country: Romania
- County: Călărași

Government
  - Mayor (2024–2028): Alin Daniel Ploeșteanu (PSD)
- Area: 110 km^{2} (42 sq mi)
- Elevation: 30 m (98 ft)
- Population (2021-12-01): 1,683
  - Density: 15/km^{2} (40/sq mi)
- Time zone: UTC+02:00 (EET)
  - Summer (DST): UTC+03:00 (EEST)
- Postal code: 917090
- Area code: +(40) 242
- Vehicle reg.: CL
- Website: www.primariacomuneifrasinet.ro

Frăsinet is a commune in Călărași County, Muntenia, Romania. It is composed of six villages: Curătești, Dănești, Frăsinet, Frăsinetu de Jos, Luptători, and Tăriceni.

Historical population
Year	Pop.	±%
2002	2,048	—
2011	1,845	−9.9%
2021	1,683	−8.8%
Source: Census data

At the 2021 census, the population of Frăsinet was 1,683.
