= Unirea, Călărași =

Unirea
- Commune
- World War I monument

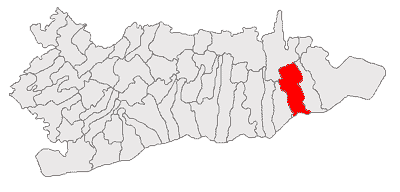
- Location in Călărași County

- Location in Romania
- Coordinates: 44.27°N 27.63°E
- Country: Romania
- County: Călărași

Government
  - Mayor (2020–2024): Ciprian Andrei Olteanu (PNL)
- Elevation: 19 m (62 ft)
- Population (2021-12-01): 2,531
- Time zone: UTC+02:00 (EET)
  - Summer (DST): UTC+03:00 (EEST)
- Postal code: 917270
- Area code: +(40) 242
- Vehicle reg.: CL
- Website: www.primaria-unirea.ro

Unirea is a commune in Călărași County, Muntenia, Romania. It is composed of two villages, Unirea (until 1964, Șocariciu) and Oltina.

Historical population
Year	Pop.	±%
2002	2,993	—
2011	2,636	−11.9%
2021	2,531	−4.0%
Source: Census data
