= Dragoș Vodă, Călărași =

Dragoș Vodă
- Commune
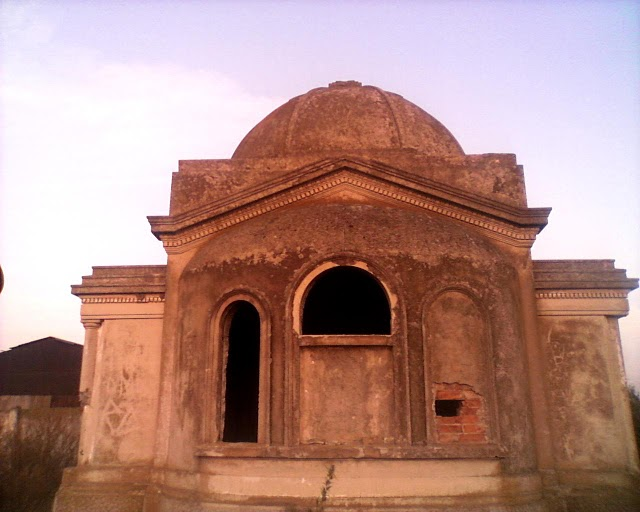
- Funeral chapel in Dragoș Vodă

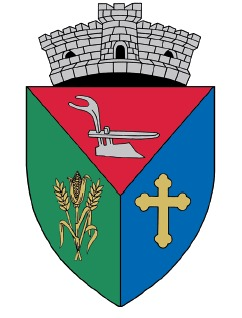
- Coat of arms

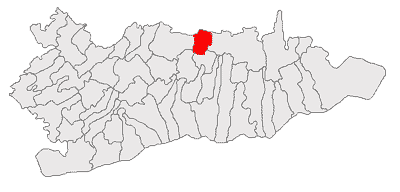
- Location in Călărași County

- Location in Romania
- Coordinates: 44°26′N 27°9′E
- Country: Romania
- County: Călărași

Government
  - Mayor (2024–2028): Radu Aurel Ion (PSD)
- Area: 128.65 km^{2} (49.67 sq mi)
- Elevation: 43 m (141 ft)
- Population (2021-12-01): 3,016
  - Density: 23.44/km^{2} (60.72/sq mi)
- Time zone: UTC+02:00 (EET)
  - Summer (DST): UTC+03:00 (EEST)
- Postal code: 917085
- Area code: +(40) 242
- Vehicle reg.: CL
- Website: primariadragosvoda.ro

Dragoș Vodă is a commune in Călărași County, Muntenia, Romania. It is composed of three villages: Bogdana, Dragoș Vodă, and Socoalele.

Historical population
Year	Pop.	±%
2002	3,038	—
2011	2,862	−5.8%
2021	3,016	+5.4%
Source: Census data

At the 2021 census, the population of Dragoș Vodă was 3,016.
