= Dichiseni =

- Commune
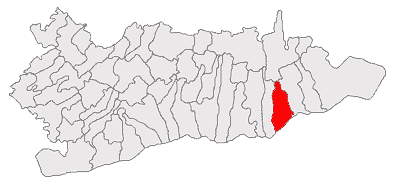
- Location in Călărași County

- Location in Romania
- Coordinates: 44°14′N 27°32′E
- Country: Romania
- County: Călărași

Government
  - Mayor (2020–2024): Iulian Radu (PNL)
- Area: 94.26 km^{2} (36.39 sq mi)
- Elevation: 14 m (46 ft)
- Population (2021-12-01): 1,641
  - Density: 17.41/km^{2} (45.09/sq mi)
- Time zone: UTC+02:00 (EET)
  - Summer (DST): UTC+03:00 (EEST)
- Postal code: 917050
- Area code: +(40) 242
- Vehicle reg.: CL
- Website: www.primariadichiseni.ro

Dichiseni is a commune in Călărași County, Muntenia, Romania with 1,641 inhabitants as of the 2021 census. It is composed of four villages: Coslogeni, Dichiseni, Libertatea, and Satnoeni.

Historical population
Year	Pop.	±%
2002	1,863	—
2011	1,734	−6.9%
2021	1,641	−5.4%
Source: Census data
