= Nicolae Bălcescu, Călărași =

Nicolae Bălcescu
- Commune
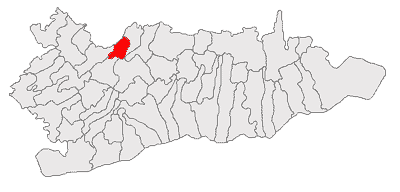
- Location in Călărași County

- Location in Romania
- Coordinates: 44°27′N 26°45′E
- Country: Romania
- County: Călărași

Government
  - Mayor (2024–2028): Georgiana Teodorescu (PSD)
- Area: 35.51 km^{2} (13.71 sq mi)
- Elevation: 55 m (180 ft)
- Population (2021-12-01): 1,625
  - Density: 45.76/km^{2} (118.5/sq mi)
- Time zone: UTC+02:00 (EET)
  - Summer (DST): UTC+03:00 (EEST)
- Postal code: 917190
- Area code: +(40) 242
- Vehicle reg.: CL
- Website: www.primarianicolaebalcescu.ro

Nicolae Bălcescu is a commune in Călărași County, Muntenia, Romania. It is composed of three villages: Fântâna Doamnei, Nicolae Bălcescu, and Paicu.

Historical population
Year	Pop.	±%
2002	1,707	—
2011	1,776	+4.0%
2021	1,625	−8.5%
Source: Census data

At the 2021 census, the population of Nicolae Bălcescu was 1,625. It is named after Nicolae Bălcescu.
