= Dor Mărunt =

- Commune
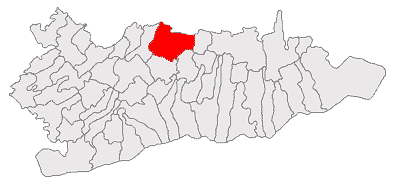
- Location in Călărași County

- Location in Romania
- Coordinates: 44°27′N 26°55′E
- Country: Romania
- County: Călărași

Government
  - Mayor (2024–208): Ion Iacomi (PSD)
- Area: 156 km^{2} (60 sq mi)
- Elevation: 49 m (161 ft)
- Population (2021-12-01): 6,469
  - Density: 41.5/km^{2} (107/sq mi)
- Time zone: UTC+02:00 (EET)
  - Summer (DST): UTC+03:00 (EEST)
- Postal code: 917055
- Area code: +(40) 242
- Vehicle reg.: CL
- Website: comunadormarunt.ro

Dor Mărunt is a commune in Călărași County, Muntenia, Romania. It is composed of six villages: Dâlga, Dâlga-Gară, Dor Mărunt, Înfrățirea, Ogoru, and Pelinu.

Historical population
Year	Pop.	±%
2002	6,904	—
2011	6,349	−8.0%
2021	6,469	+1.9%
Source: Census data

At the 2011 census, the population of Dor Mărunt was 6,349. At the 2021 census, the population had increased to 6,469.
