= Șoldanu =

- Commune
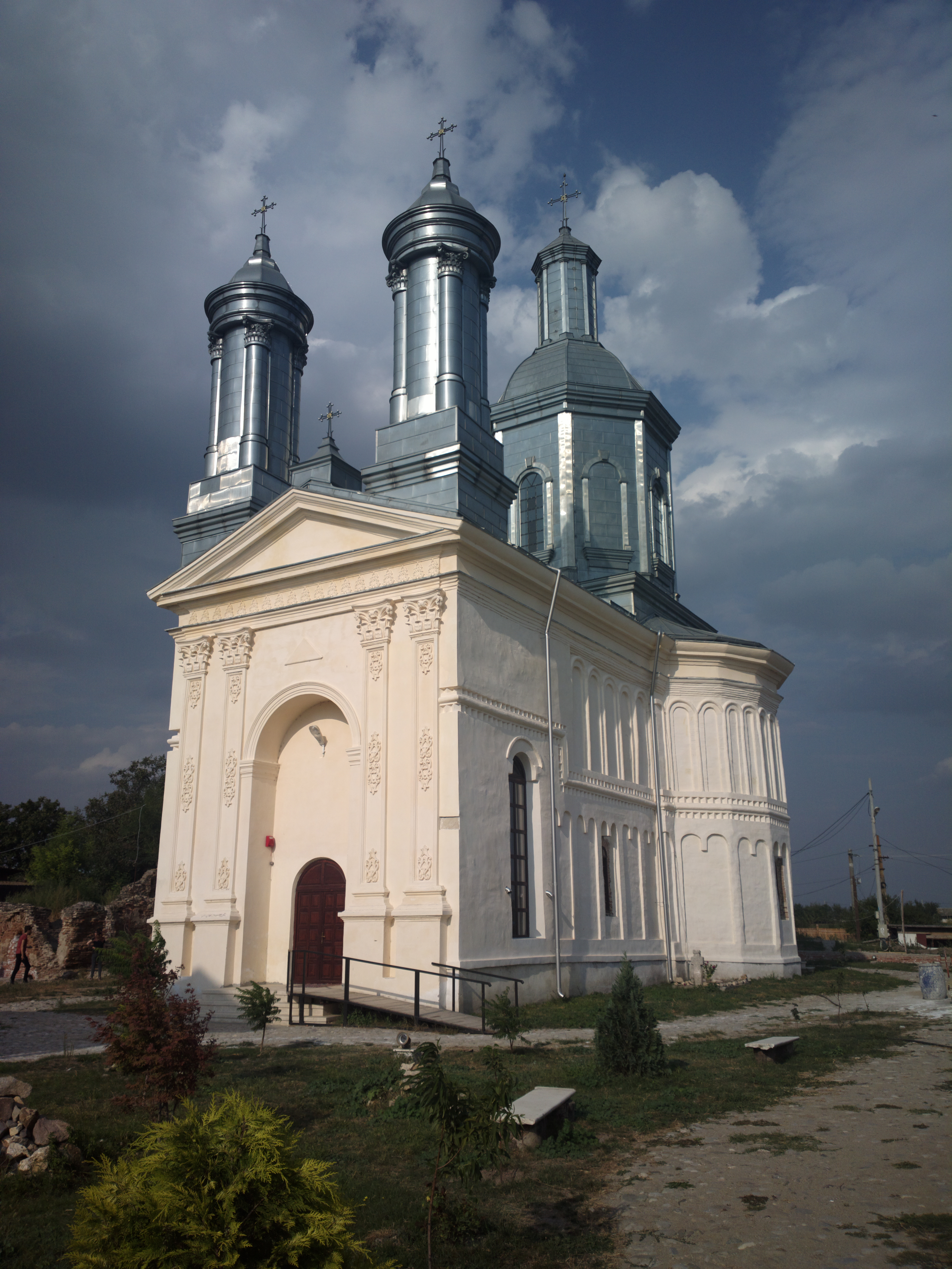
- Negoești Monastery

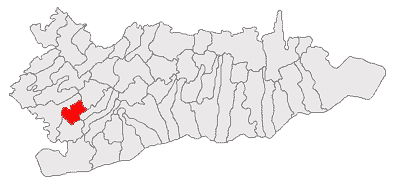
- Location in Călărași County

- Location in Romania
- Coordinates: 44°13′N 26°31′E
- Country: Romania
- County: Călărași

Government
  - Mayor (2024–2028): Ion Bucur (PSD)
- Area: 42.27 km^{2} (16.32 sq mi)
- Elevation: 36 m (118 ft)
- Population (2021-12-01): 3,296
  - Density: 77.97/km^{2} (202.0/sq mi)
- Time zone: UTC+02:00 (EET)
  - Summer (DST): UTC+03:00 (EEST)
- Postal code: 917235
- Area code: +(40) 242
- Vehicle reg.: CL
- Website: primaria-soldanu.ro

Șoldanu is a commune in Călărași County, Muntenia, Romania, 44 km (27 mi) away from Bucharest. It is composed of two villages: Negoești and Șoldanu.

Historical population
Year	Pop.	±%
2002	3,533	—
2011	3,565	+0.9%
2021	3,296	−7.5%
Source: Census data
