= Independența, Călărași =

Independența
- Commune
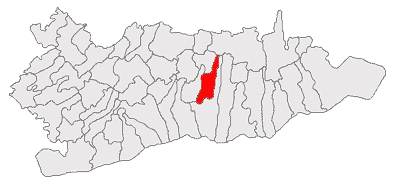
- Location in Călărași County

- Location in Romania
- Coordinates: 44°17′N 27°9′E
- Country: Romania
- County: Călărași

Government
  - Mayor (2024–2028): Gabriel Rădulescu (PSD)
- Elevation: 30 m (98 ft)
- Population (2021-12-01): 3,277
- Time zone: UTC+02:00 (EET)
  - Summer (DST): UTC+03:00 (EEST)
- Postal code: 917140
- Area code: +(40) 242
- Vehicle reg.: CL
- Website: primariaindependenta.ro

Independența (Romanian pronunciation: [indepenˈdent͡sa]) is a commune in Călărași County, Muntenia, Romania. It is composed of three villages: Independența, Potcoava, and Vișinii.

Historical population
Year	Pop.	±%
2002	3,916	—
2011	3,466	−11.5%
2021	3,277	−5.5%
Source: Census data

At the 2021 census, the population of Independența was 3,277.

== Climate ==
The average temperature is 14 °C . The warmest month is July, at 26 °C, and the coldest is February, at 1 °C. The average rainfall is 915 mm per year. The wettest month is May, with 130 mm of rain, and the driest is November, with 48 mm.
