= Dorobanțu, Călărași =

Dorobanțu
- Commune
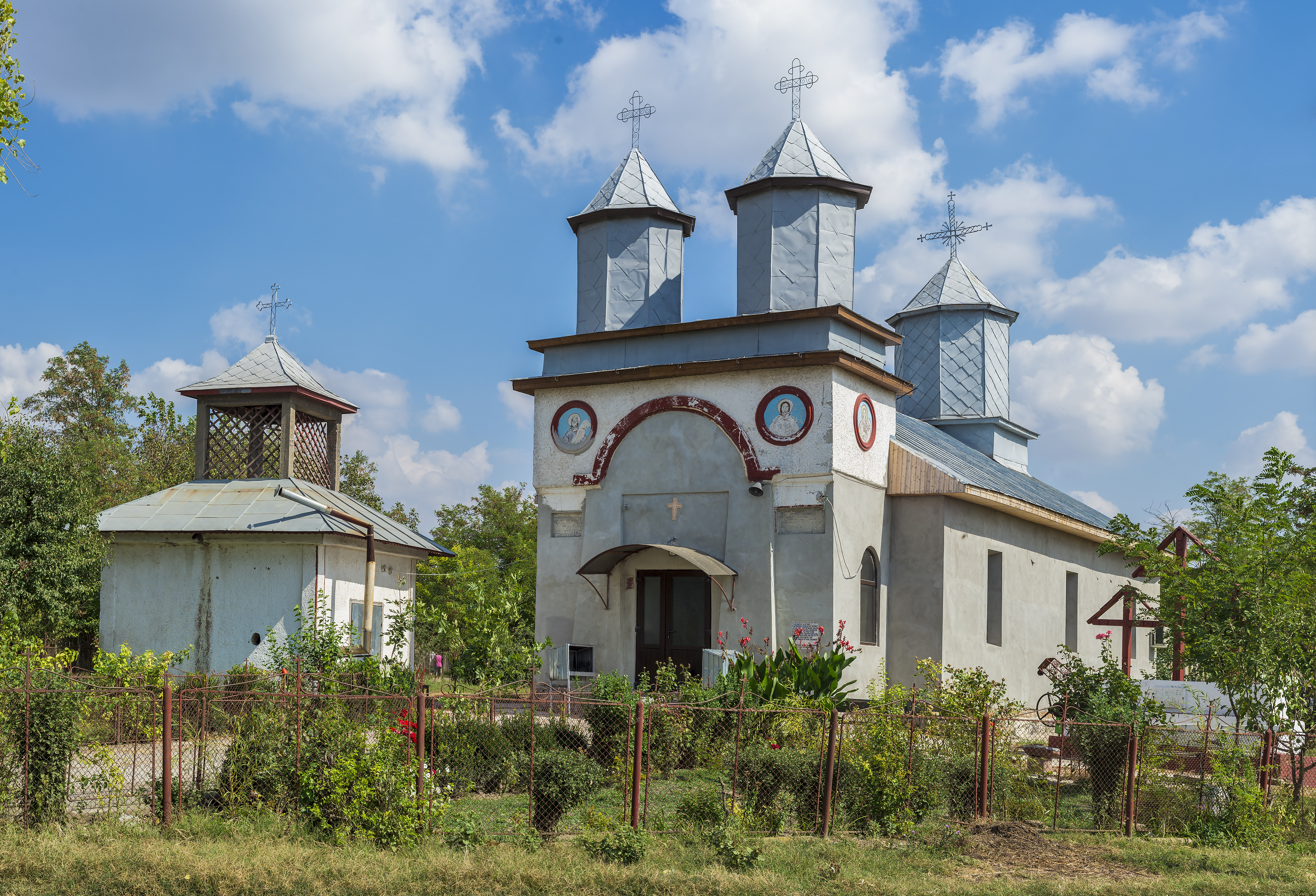
- Trinity Church in Vărăști

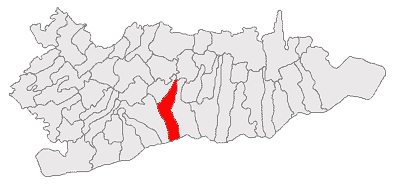
- Location in Călărași County

- Location in Romania
- Coordinates: 44°13′N 26°57′E
- Country: Romania
- County: Călărași

Government
  - Mayor (2024–2028): Vasile Stoica (PNL)
- Area: 102.89 km^{2} (39.73 sq mi)
- Elevation: 16 m (52 ft)
- Population (2021-12-01): 2,749
  - Density: 26.72/km^{2} (69.20/sq mi)
- Time zone: UTC+02:00 (EET)
  - Summer (DST): UTC+03:00 (EEST)
- Postal code: 917065
- Area code: +(40) x42
- Vehicle reg.: CL
- Website: primariadorobantu.ro

Dorobanțu (Romanian pronunciation: [doroˈbant͡su];) is a commune in Călărași County, Muntenia, Romania. It is composed of three villages: Boșneagu, Dorobanțu, and Vărăști.

Historical population
Year	Pop.	±%
2002	3,481	—
2011	3,065	−12.0%
2021	2,749	−10.3%
Source: Census data

At the 2011 census, the population of Dorobanțu was 3,065. At the 2021 census, the population had decreased to 2,749.
