= Vlad Țepeș, Călărași =

Vlad Țepeș
- Commune
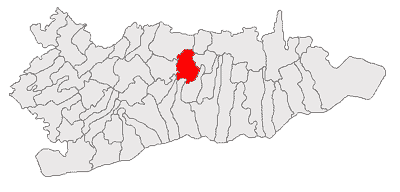
- Location in Călărași County

- Location in Romania
- Coordinates: 44°21′N 27°5′E
- Country: Romania
- County: Călărași

Government
  - Mayor (2024–2028): Marian Iliuță (PSD)
- Area: 64.68 km^{2} (24.97 sq mi)
- Elevation: 40 m (130 ft)
- Population (2021-12-01): 2,031
  - Density: 31.40/km^{2} (81.33/sq mi)
- Time zone: UTC+02:00 (EET)
  - Summer (DST): UTC+03:00 (EEST)
- Postal code: 917295
- Area code: +40 x42
- Vehicle reg.: CL
- Website: primariavladtepes.ro

Vlad Țepeș is a commune in Călărași County, Muntenia, Romania. As of the 2021 census, Vlad Țepeș had a population of 2,031.

The commune and one of its two villages are named after Vlad Țepeș; the other village, Mihai Viteazu, is named after Michael the Brave.

The commune is located in the Bărăgan Plain, in the central part of the county, 25 km (16 mi) northwest of the county seat, Călărași.

Historical population
Year	Pop.	±%
2002	2,619	—
2011	2,336	−10.8%
2021	2,031	−13.1%
Source: Census data

== Natives ==
- Octav Sargețiu (1908–1994), poet
