= Luica =

Commune in Romania

- Commune
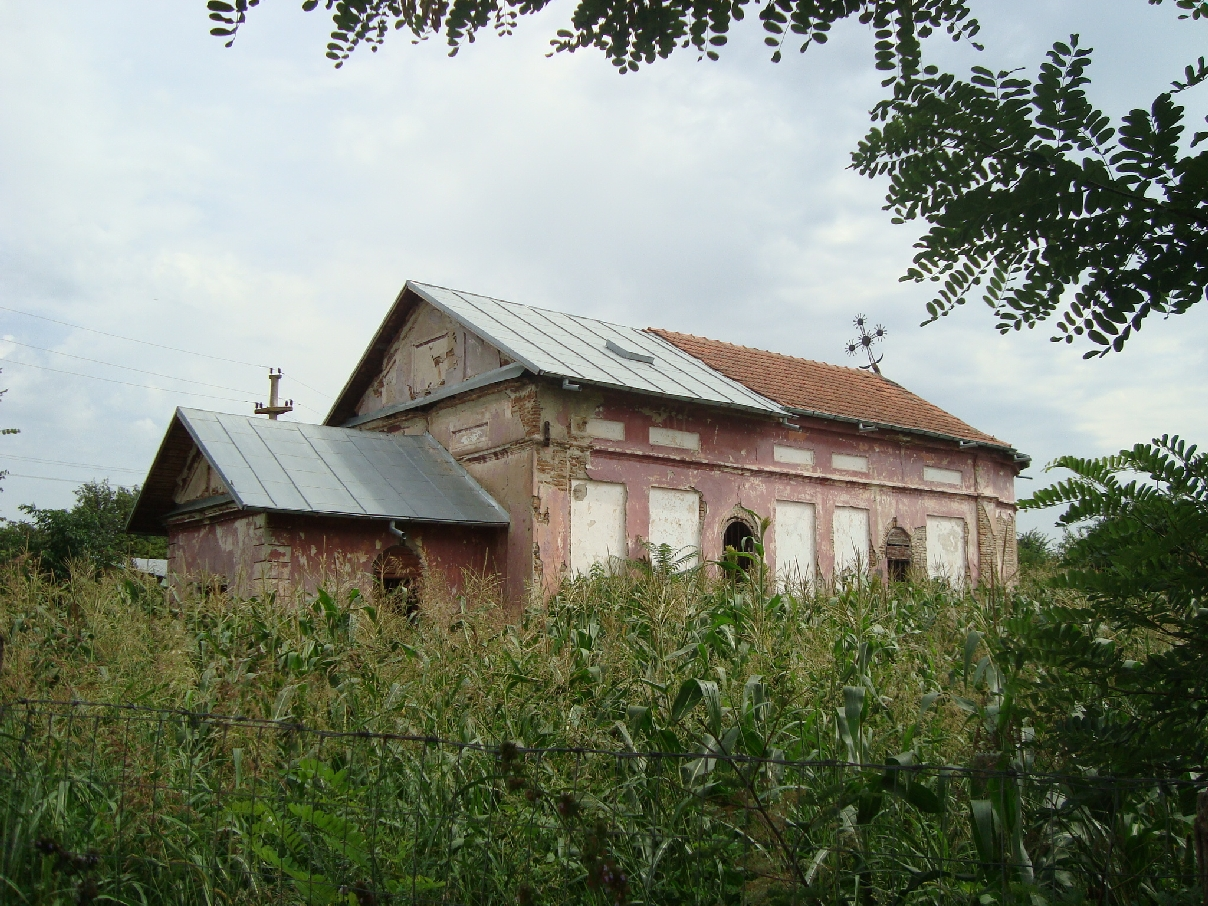
- Abandoned church in Luica

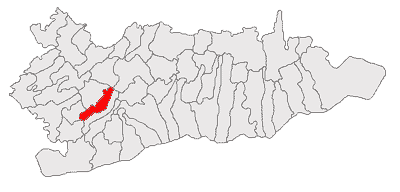
- Location in Călărași County

- Location in Romania
- Coordinates: 44°14′N 26°35′E
- Country: Romania
- County: Călărași

Government
  - Mayor (2024–2028): Ion Dobrin (PNL)
- Elevation: 42 m (138 ft)
- Population (2021-12-01): 2,032
- Time zone: UTC+02:00 (EET)
  - Summer (DST): UTC+03:00 (EEST)
- Postal code: 917155
- Area code: +(40) 242
- Vehicle reg.: CL
- Website: www.primaria-luica.ro

Luica is a commune in Călărași County, Muntenia, Romania. It is composed of two villages, Luica and Valea Stânii. At the 2021 census, Luica had a population of 2,032.

Historical population
Year	Pop.	±%
2002	2,301	—
2011	2,272	−1.3%
2021	2,032	−10.6%
Source: Census data
