= Lehliu Gară =

- Town
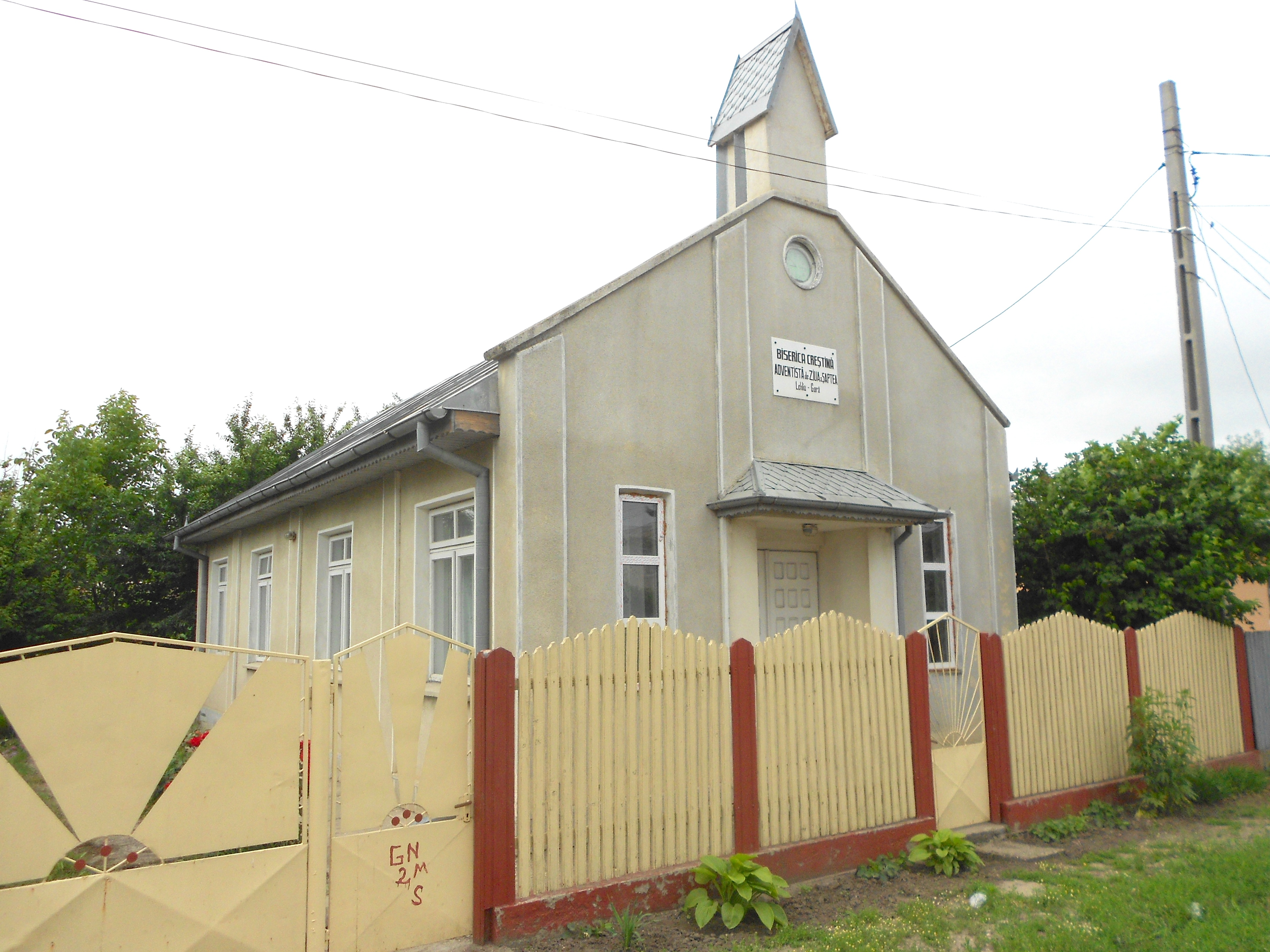
- Seventh Day Adventist church in Lehliu Gară

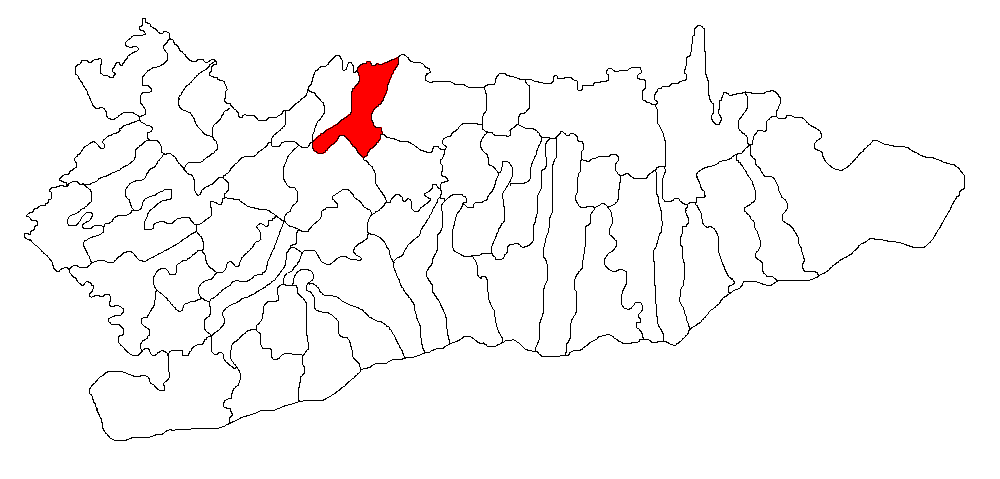
- Location in Călărași County

- Location in Romania
- Coordinates: 44°26′18″N 26°51′12″E
- Country: Romania
- County: Călărași

Government
  - Mayor (2024–2028): Iulian Iacomi (PSD)
- Area: 86 km^{2} (33 sq mi)
- Elevation: 55 m (180 ft)
- Population (2021-12-01): 5,991
  - Density: 70/km^{2} (180/sq mi)
- Time zone: UTC+02:00 (EET)
  - Summer (DST): UTC+03:00 (EEST)
- Postal code: 915300
- Area code: +(40) 242
- Vehicle reg.: CL
- Website: www.primarialehliugara.ro

Lehliu Gară is a small town in the middle of the Bărăgan region in Călărași County, Muntenia, Romania, with a railway station and a national road linking the seaside Constanța and the county capital, Călărași. Also, the new A2 free-way passes nearby, by going to the sea. It officially became a town in 1989, as a result of the Romanian rural systematization program.

A network of interconnected lakes, situated in the middle of the Bărăgan plains, the farmland is almost completely cultivated with cereals. The forests are in a 10 km radius around it.

Historical population
| Year | Pop. | ±% |
|---|---|---|
| 1992 | 6,622 | — |
| 2002 | 6,667 | +0.7% |
| 2011 | 6,072 | −8.9% |
| 2021 | 5,991 | −1.3% |
Source: Census data

The town administers three villages: Buzoeni, Răzvani, and Valea Seacă. Buzoeni is situated south-west of Lehliu Gară and it is a remote and isolated village with beautiful landscapes, forests, lakes, hills, and large surfaces cultivated. The average age in Buzoeni is 45 years. The people here usually lead a very quiet life, conserving a lifestyle from the past, with little modern influence.
