= Lupșanu =

- Commune
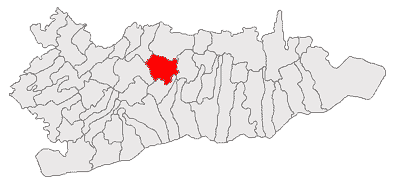
- Location in Călărași County

- Location in Romania
- Coordinates: 44°23′N 26°54′E
- Country: Romania
- County: Călărași

Government
  - Mayor (2024–2028): Ștefan Câmpulungeanu (PSD)
- Area: 94.31 km^{2} (36.41 sq mi)
- Elevation: 44 m (144 ft)
- Population (2021-12-01): 3,004
  - Density: 31.85/km^{2} (82.50/sq mi)
- Time zone: UTC+02:00 (EET)
  - Summer (DST): UTC+03:00 (EEST)
- Postal code: 917160
- Area code: +(40) 242
- Vehicle reg.: CL
- Website: primarialupsanu.ro

Lupșanu is a commune in Călărași County, Muntenia, Romania. It is composed of five villages: Lupșanu, Nucetu, Plevna, Radu Vodă, and Valea Rusului.

Historical population
Year	Pop.	±%
2002	3,838	—
2011	3,499	−8.8%
2021	3,004	−14.1%
Source: Census data

== Natives ==
- Sofronie Vulpescu (1856 – 1923), bishop within the Romanian Orthodox Church
