= Călărași County =

County of Romania

Coordinates: 47°15′N 28°20′E

Călărași County Județul Călărași
- County
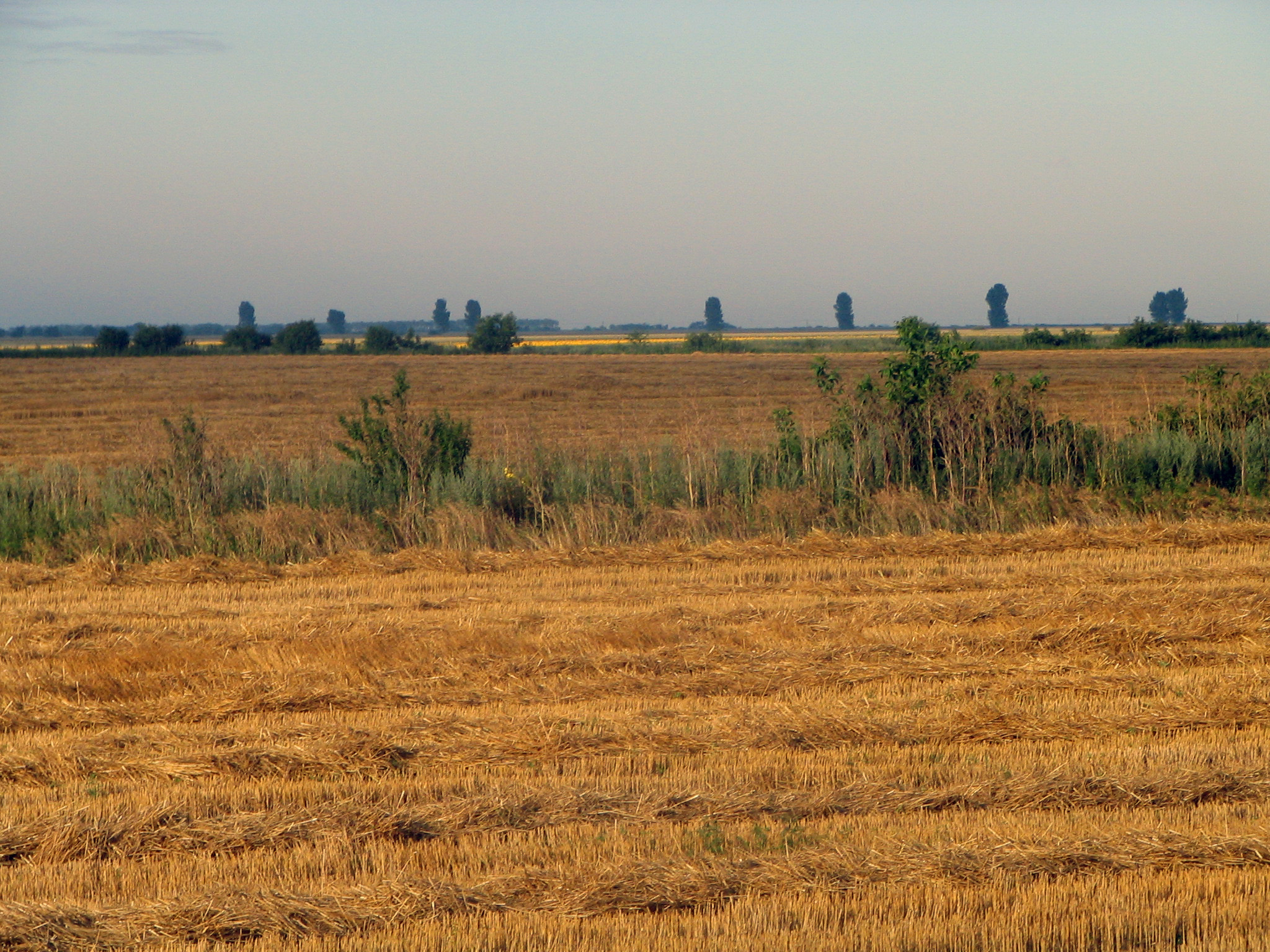
- Landscape in Călărași County

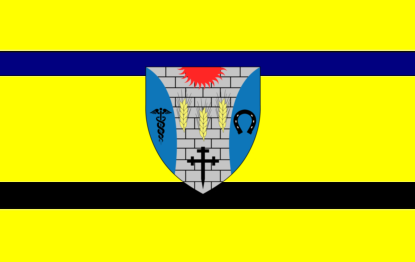
- Flag Coat of arms

- Country: Romania
- Development region^{1}: Sud
- Historic region: Muntenia
- Capital city (Reședință de județ): Călărași
- Created: 1981

Government
  - Type: County Council
  - President of the County Council: Vasile Iliuță (PSD)
  - Prefect^{2}: Valentin-Dumitru Deculescu

Area
  - Total: 5,088 km^{2} (1,964 sq mi)
  - Rank: 28th in Romania

Population (2021-12-01)
  - Total: 283,458
  - Rank: 34th in Romania
  - Density: 56.02/km^{2} (145.1/sq mi)
- Time zone: UTC+2 (EET)
  - Summer (DST): UTC+3 (EEST)
- Postal Code: 91wxyz^{3}
- Area code: +40 x42^{4}
- Car Plates: CL^{5}
- GDP: US$1.635 billion (2015)
- GDP/capita: US$5,736 (2015)
- Website: County Council; County Prefecture
- ^{1}The development regions of Romania have no administrative role. They were formed as a way of managing funds from the European Union^{2} as of 2007, the Prefect is not a politician, but a public functionary. He (or she) is not allowed to be a member of a political party, and is banned from having any political activity in the first six months after resigning (or being excluded) from the public functionary corps^{3}w, x, y, and z are digits that indicate the city, the street, part of the street, or even the building of the address^{4}x is a digit indicating the operator: 2 for the former national operator, Romtelecom, and 3 for the other ground telephone networks^{5}used on both the plates of the vehicles that operate only in the county limits (like utility vehicles, ATVs, etc.), and the ones used outside the county

Călărași (Romanian pronunciation: [kələˈraʃʲ]) is a county (județ) of Romania on the border with Bulgaria, in Muntenia, with the county seat at Călărași.

== Demographics ==
In 2011, it had a population of 285,050 and a population density of 56.02/km^{2}.

- Romanians – 94.1%
- Romani – 5.7%
- Turks - 0.1%
- Unknown - 0.1%

| Year | County population |
|---|---|
| 1948 | 287,722 |
| 1956 | 318,573 ▲ |
| 1966 | 337,261 ▲ |
| 1977 | 338,807 ▲ |
| 1992 | 338,844 ▼ |
| 2002 | 324,617 ▼ |
| 2011 | 285,050 ▼ |
| 2021 | 283,458 ▼ |

=== List of cities by population ===
All the data, except Călărași, is as of 2002.

- Călărași (county's capital and largest city) – 58,211 (as of 2021)
- Oltenița – 27,217
- Modelu (county's largest village) – 9,804
- Budești (with Crivăț village) – 9,709
- Borcea (village) – 9,676
- Dragalina (village) – 8,760
- Chirnogi (village) – 8,131

The other two towns of Călărași county (Lehliu Gară and Fundulea) have a population under 8,000 inhabitants.

== Geography ==
This county has an area of 5,088 km^{2}.

The entire area lies in the southern part of the Bărăgan Plain and is crossed by small rivers with deep valleys. On its southern and eastern sides there is the valley of the Danube which, on the eastern side, splits into a number of branches, forming islands, now drained. On the western side, the rivers Argeș and Dâmbovița form a wide valley before flowing into the Danube.

=== Neighbours ===
- Constanța County to the East.
- Ilfov County and Giurgiu County to the West.
- Ialomița County to the North.
- Bulgaria to the South – Silistra Province

== Economy ==
Agriculture is the county's main industry, generating about 3% of the entire country's agricultural output.

The county's industries:

- Metallurgy – there is a big metallurgical plant in Călărași, similar to the one in Galați
- Food processing
- Textiles
- Construction materials

== Tourism ==
Tourism in the county is uncommon. There are only 3 hotels in Călărași County. The main tourist destinations:

- The town of Călărași;
- The town of Oltenița;
- Fishing on the Danube.

== Politics ==
The Călărași County Council, elected at the 2024 local elections, consists of 31 councilors, with the following party composition:

| Party | Seats | Current County Council |
|---|---|---|
| Social Democratic Party (PSD) | 18 | |
| National Liberal Party (PNL) | 9 | |
| Alliance for the Union of Romanians (AUR) | 4 | |

== Administrative divisions ==
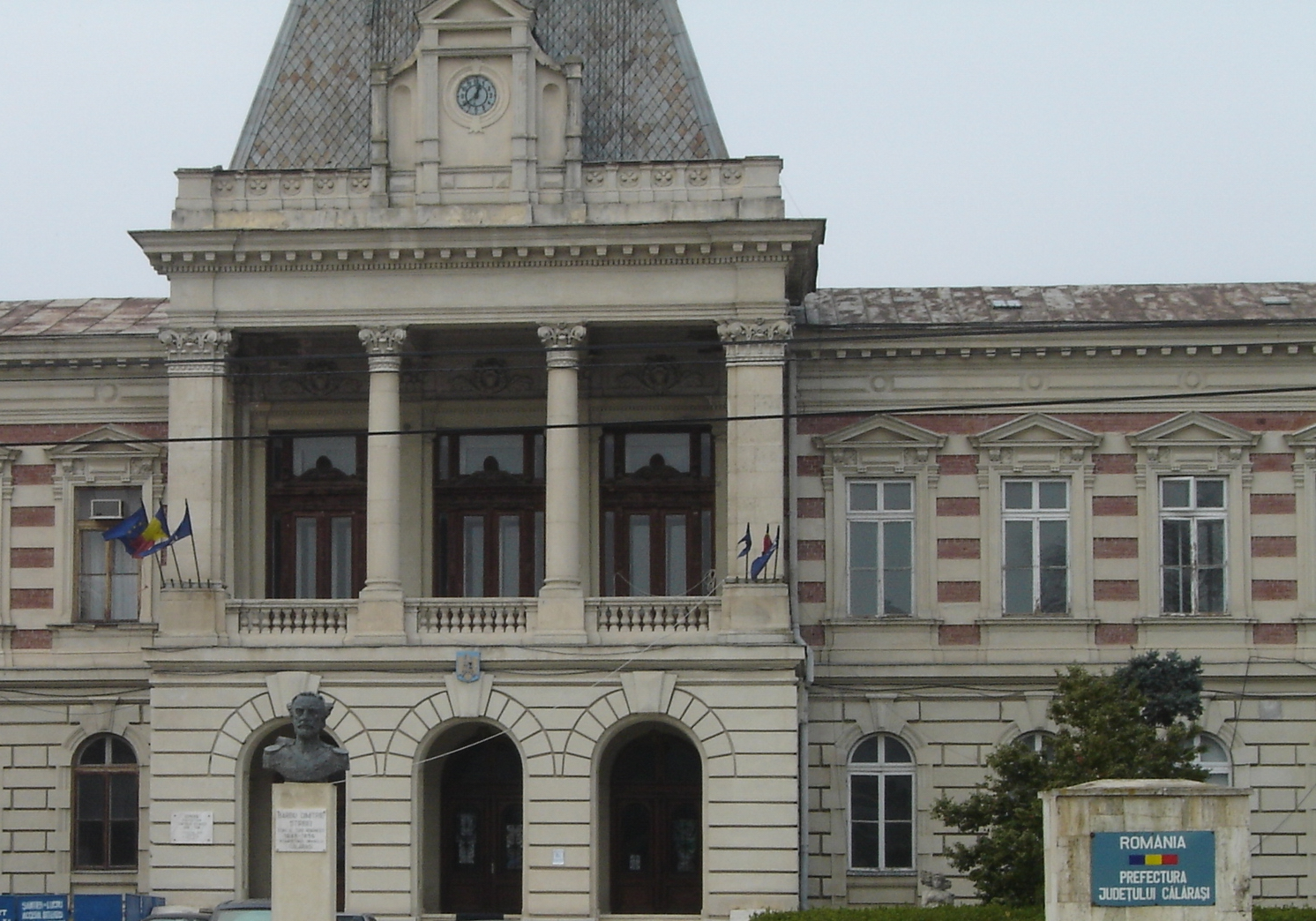
Călărași

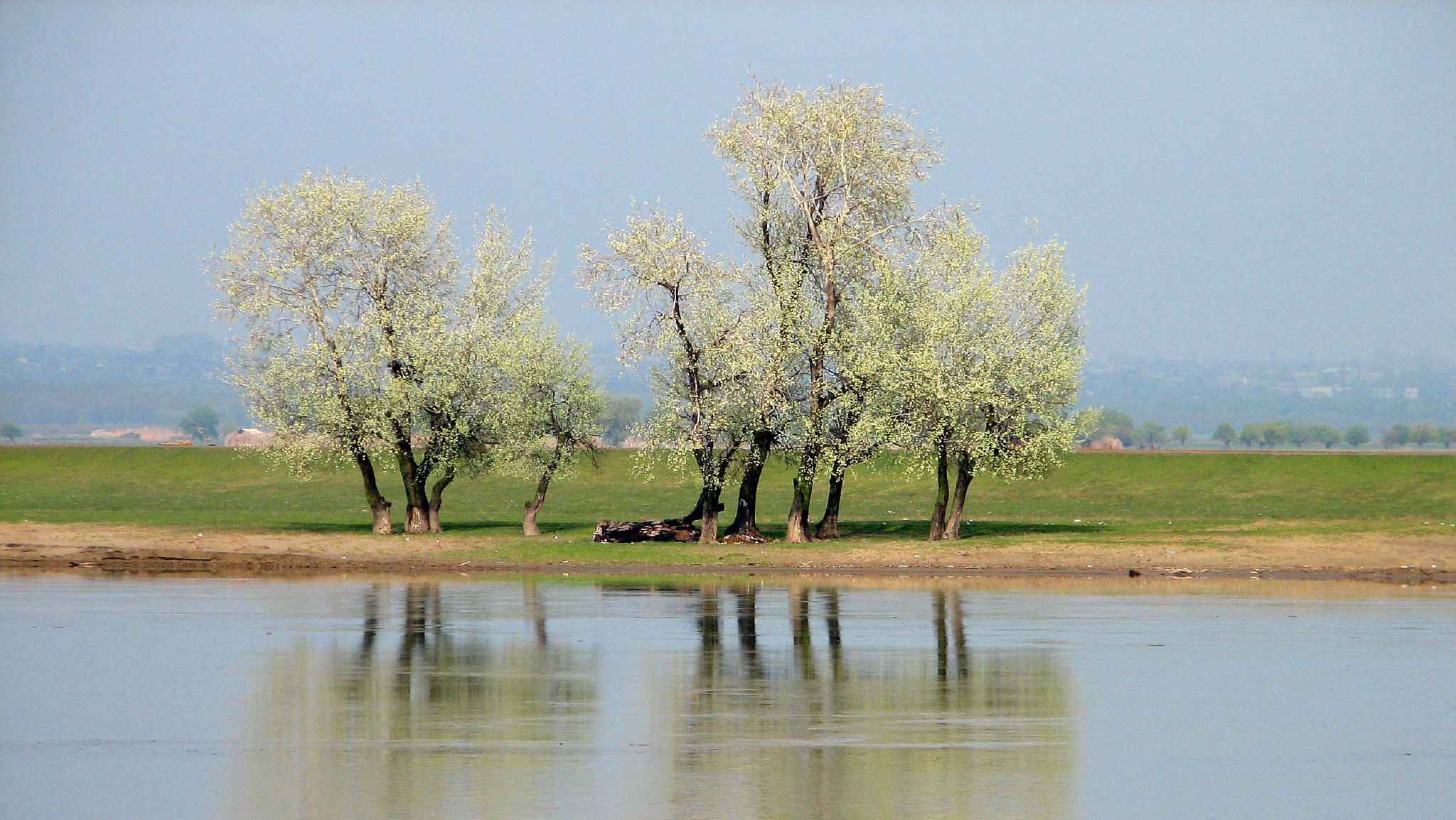
Danube near Oltenița

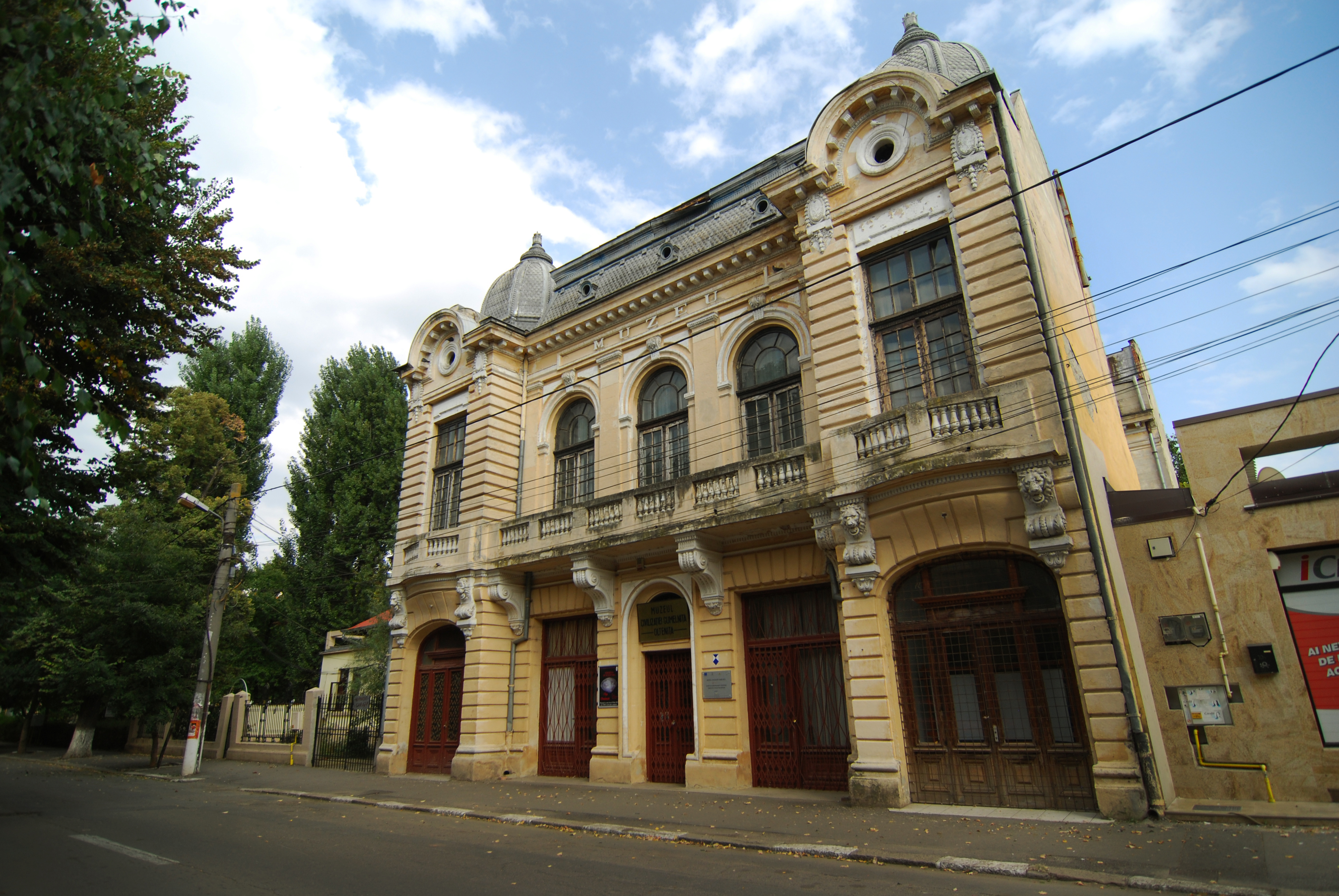
Oltenița

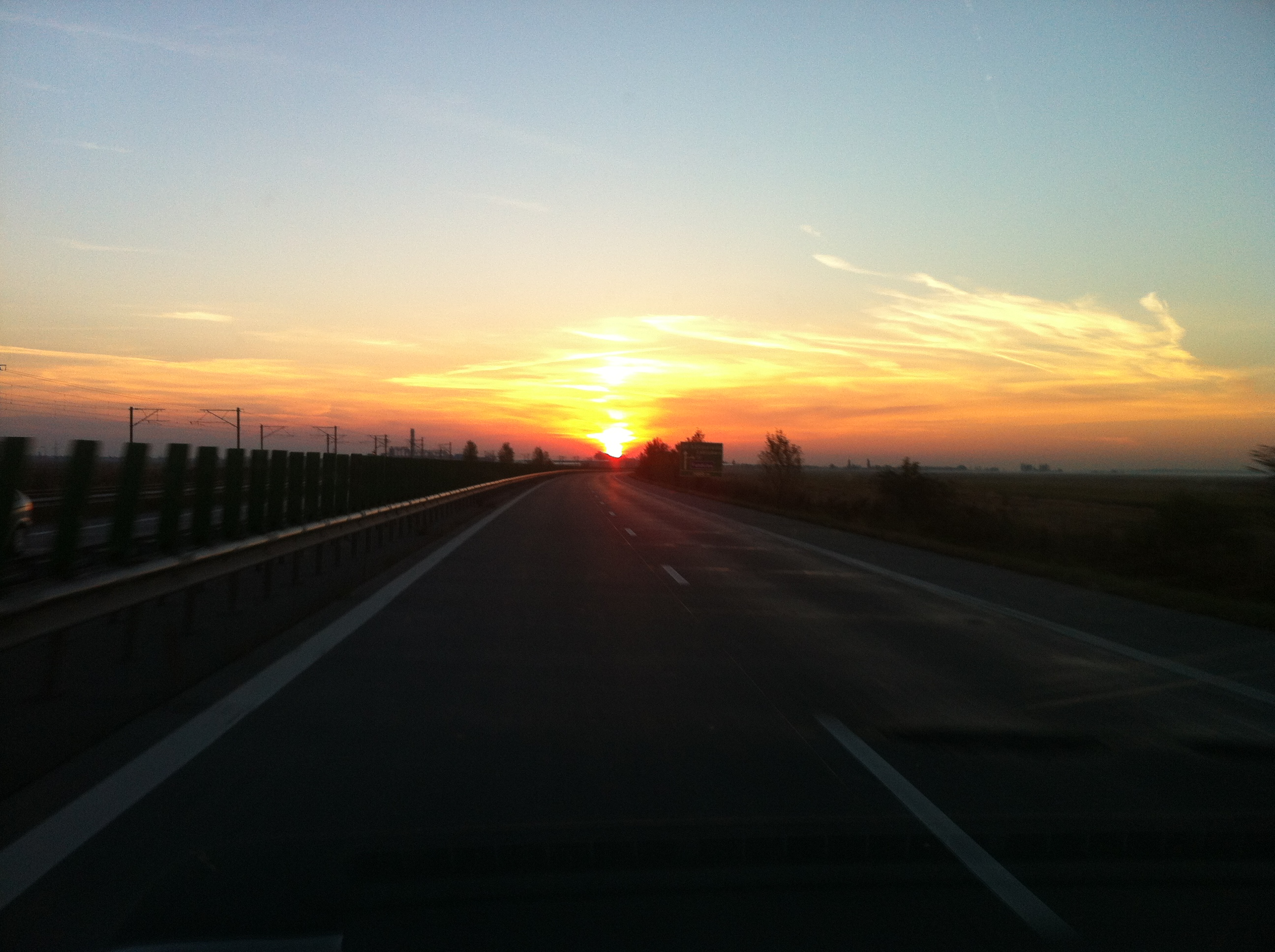
Scenery near Fundulea

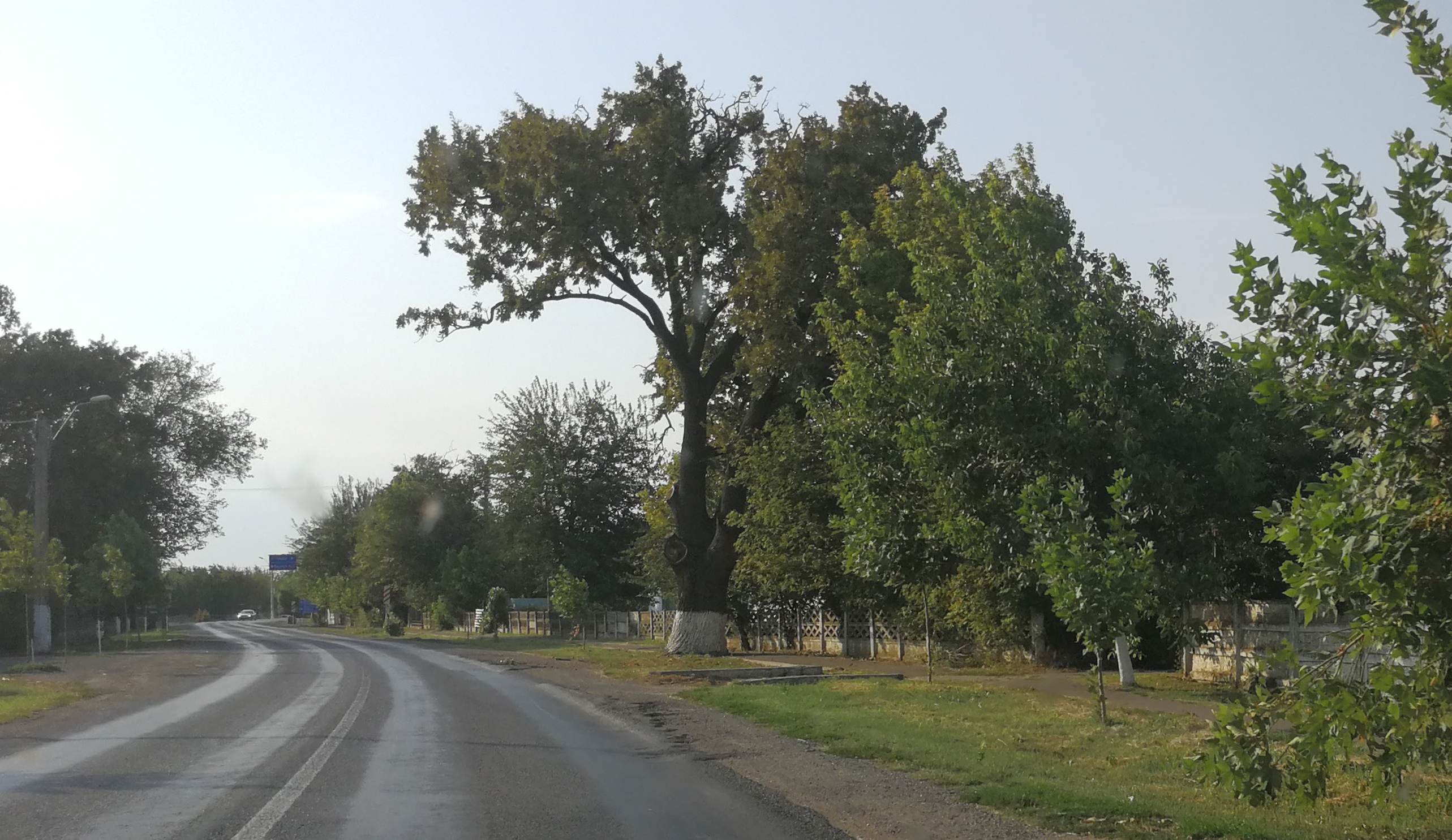
Lehliu-Gară

Călărași County has 2 municipalities, 3 towns and 50 communes

- Municipalities
  - Călărași – county seat; population: 65,181 (as of 2011)
  - Oltenița
- Towns
  - Budești
  - Fundulea
  - Lehliu-Gară
- Communes
  - Alexandru Odobescu
  - Belciugatele
  - Borcea
  - Căscioarele
  - Chirnogi
  - Chiselet
  - Crivăț
  - Ciocănești
  - Curcani
  - Cuza Vodă
  - Dichiseni
  - Dor Mărunt
  - Dorobanțu
  - Dragalina
  - Dragoș Vodă
  - Frăsinet
  - Frumușani
  - Fundeni
  - Gălbinași
  - Grădiștea
  - Gurbănești
  - Ileana
  - Independența
  - Jegălia
  - Lehliu
  - Luica
  - Lupșanu
  - Mânăstirea
  - Mitreni
  - Modelu
  - Nana
  - Nicolae Bălcescu
  - Perișoru
  - Plătărești
  - Radovanu
  - Roseți
  - Sărulești
  - Sohatu
  - Spanțov
  - Șoldanu
  - Ștefan cel Mare
  - Ștefan Vodă
  - Tămădău Mare
  - Ulmeni
  - Ulmu
  - Unirea
  - Valea Argovei
  - Vasilați
  - Vâlcelele
  - Vlad Țepeș
