= Valea Iașului (river) =

- Location within Romania

Location
- Country: Romania
- Counties: Argeș County
- Villages: Brătești, Ruginoasa, Bădila, Valea Iașului

Physical characteristics
- Mouth: Argeș
  - location: Curtea de Argeș
  - coordinates: 45.1542°N 24.6700°E
- Length: 12 km (7.5 mi)
- Basin size: 34 km^{2} (13 sq mi)

Basin features
- Progression: Argeș→ Danube→ Black Sea

The Valea Iașului is a left tributary of the river Argeș in Romania. It flows into the Argeș in Curtea de Argeș. Its length is 12 km (7.5 mi) and its basin size is 34 km^{2} (13 sq mi).
