= Andreescu =

Andreescu is a family name common in Romania and may refer to:

- Anghel Andreescu (born 1950), Romanian general
- Bianca Andreescu (born 2000), Canadian tennis player
- Gabriel Andreescu (born 1952), Romanian human rights activist and political scientist
- Ion Andreescu (1850–1882), Romanian painter
- Mihail Andreescu-Skeletty (1882–1965), Romanian composer
- Titu Andreescu (born 1956), Romanian-American mathematician
