= Bărăști (disambiguation) =

Bărăşti may refer to several places in Romania:

- Bărăști, a commune in Olt County
- Bărăşti, a village in Albac Commune, Alba County
- Bărăşti, a village in Cicănești Commune, Argeș County
- Bărăşti, a village in Cislău Commune, Buzău County
- Bărăşti, a village in Coloneşti Commune, Olt County
- Bărăşti, a village in Morunglav Commune, Olt County
- Bărăşti, a village in Boroaia Commune, Suceava County
