= Râncăciov =

Râncăciov may refer to several places in Romania:

- Râncăciov, a village in Călinești Commune, Argeș County
- Râncăciov, a village in Dragomirești Commune, Dâmbovița County
- Râncăciov (river), a tributary of the Argeș in Argeș County
