= Bănești =

Bănești may refer to the following places:

== Romania ==
- Bănești, Prahova, a commune in Prahova County
- Bănești, a village in Hălmagiu Commune, Arad County
- Bănești, a village in Sălcioara, Dâmbovița Commune, Dâmbovița County
- Bănești, a village in Iepurești Commune, Giurgiu County
- Bănești, a village in Fântânele, Suceava Commune, Suceava County
- Bănești, a village in Nicolae Bălcescu, Vâlcea Commune, Vâlcea County
- Bănești (Argeș), a river in Argeș County
- Bănești (Crișul Alb), a river in Arad County

== Moldova ==
- Bănești, Telenești, a commune in Telenești district, and its village of Băneștii Noi
