= Argeș (river) =

River in Romania

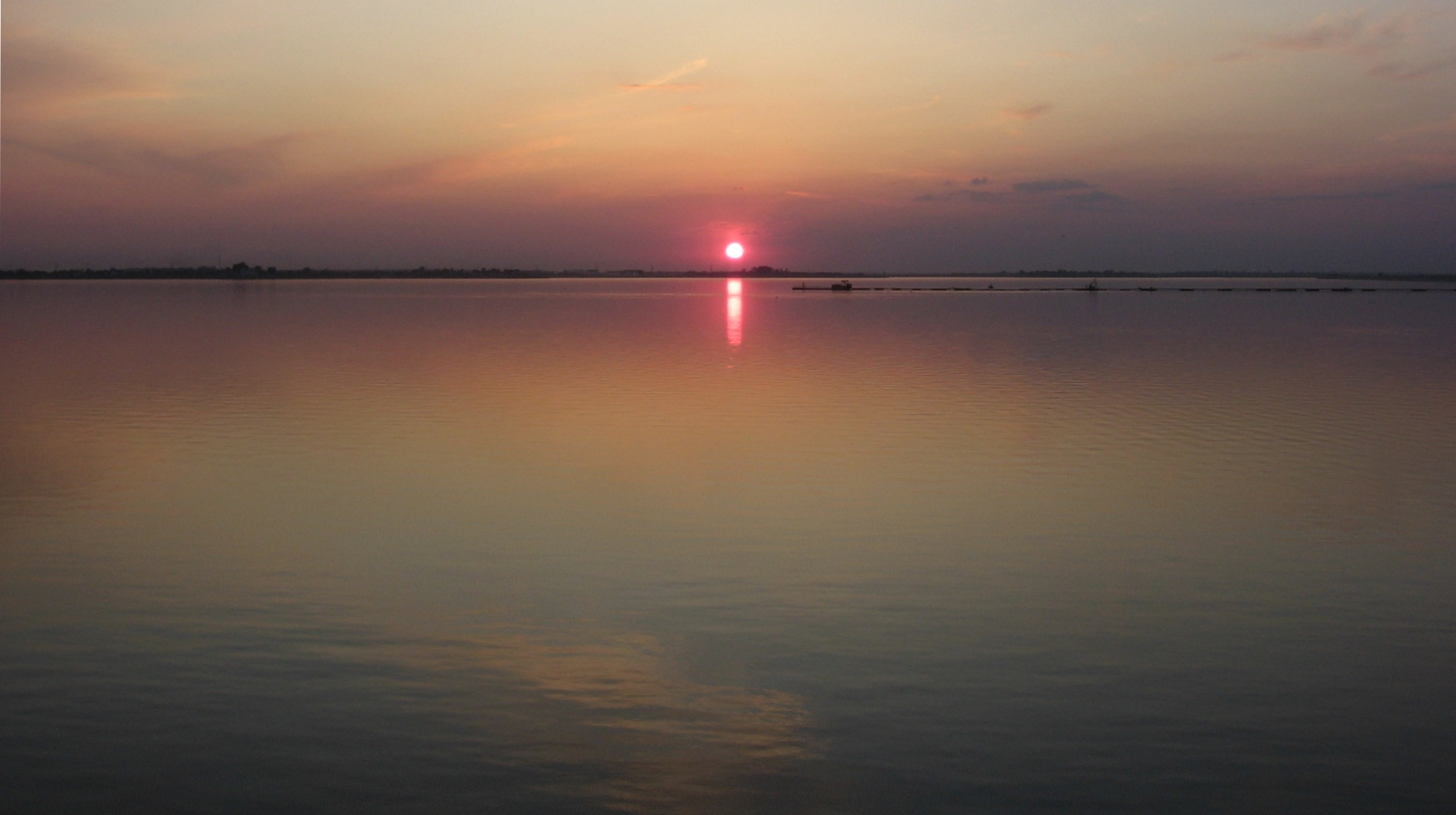
- The Argeș in Mihăilești-Cornetu

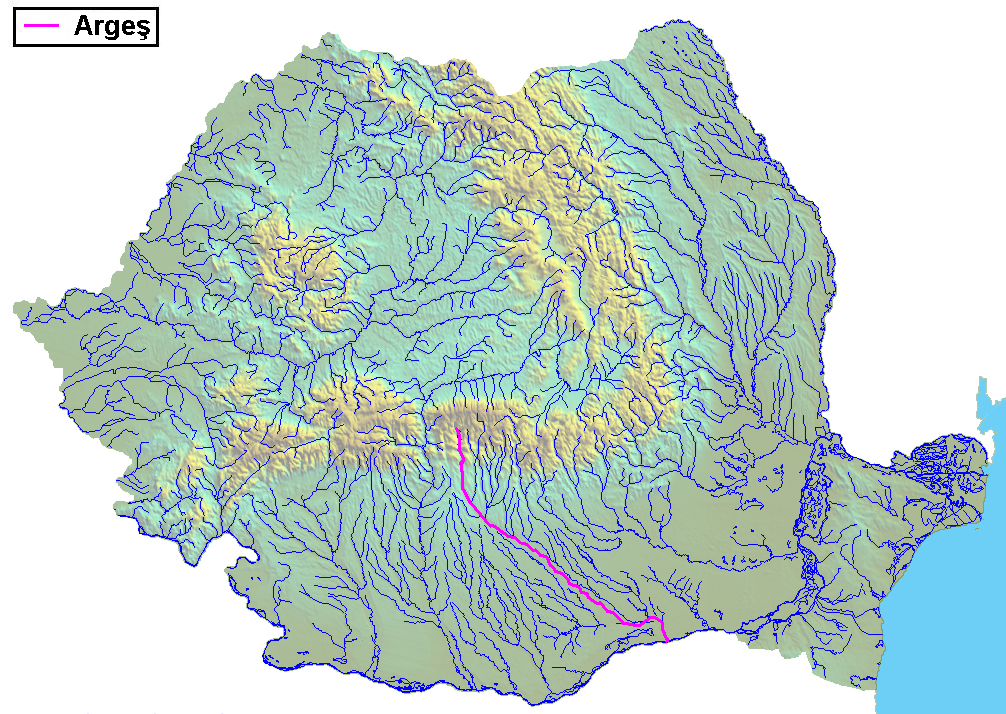
- The Argeș in Romania

Location
- Country: Romania
- Counties: Argeș; Dâmbovița; Ilfov; Giurgiu; Călărași
- Cities: Curtea de Argeș; Pitești; Oltenița

Physical characteristics
- Source: Făgăraș Mountains
  - location: Arefu
  - coordinates: 45°36′04″N 24°37′30″E
  - elevation: 2,030 m (6,660 ft)
- Mouth: Danube
  - location: Oltenița
  - coordinates: 44°3′33″N 26°37′1″E
  - elevation: 11 m (36 ft)
- Length: 350 km (220 mi)
- Basin size: 12,550 km^{2} (4,850 sq mi)
- Discharge
  - location: mouth
  - average: 71 m^{3}/s (2,500 cu ft/s)

Basin features
- Progression: Danube→ Black Sea
- Tributaries
  - left: Vâlsan, Râul Doamnei, Dâmbovița
  - right: Neajlov

The Argeș (Romanian pronunciation: [ˈardʒeʃ]) is a river in Southern Romania, a left tributary of the Danube. It is 350 km (220 mi) long, and its basin area is 12,550 km^{2} (4,850 sq mi). Its source is in the Făgăraș Mountains, in the Southern Carpathians and it flows into the Danube at Oltenița. Its average discharge at the mouth is 71 m^{3}/s (2,500 cu ft/s).

The main city on the Argeș is Pitești. Upstream, it is retained by the Vidraru Dam, which has created Lake Vidraru. Its upper course, upstream of Lake Vidraru, is also called Capra.

== Name ==
The river is believed to be the same as Ὀρδησσός Ordessus, a name mentioned by Ancient Greek historian Herodotus. The etymology of Argeș is not clear. Traditionally, it was considered that it is derived from the ancient name, through a reconstructed term, *Argessis. The capital of Dacian leader Burebista was named Argedava, but it appears that it has no link with the name for the river.

An alternate etymology derives the name of the river from a Pecheneg word, transliterated into Romanian as argiș (meaning 'higher ground'). The earliest recorded variants of the name, referring to the city of Curtea de Argeș (lit. 'The Court on the Argeș'), also suggest a derivation from this word: Argyas (1369), Argies (1379), Arghiș (1427), the river probably taking the name of the city.

The Albanian word argsh/argësh means 'crude raft supported by skin bladders, crude bridge of crossbars, harrow'.

== Localities ==
The following localities are situated along the river Argeș, from source to mouth: Căpățânenii Ungureni, Căpățânenii Pământeni, Arefu, Poienarii de Argeș, Corbeni, Rotunda, Albeștii de Argeș, Curtea de Argeș, Băiculești, Merișani, Bascov, Pitești, Găești, Bolintin-Deal, Adunații-Copăceni, and Oltenița.

== Hydro energy ==
The river Argeș and some of its tributaries are used for hydro energy. The hydroelectrical system consists of several dams, lakes, tunnels and power plants. The lakes built on the Argeș River are: Vidraru, Oiești, Cerbureni, Curtea de Argeș, Zigoneni, Merișani, Budeasa, Bascov, Pitești, Călinești (or Golești), Zăvoiu (near Mătăsaru), Ogrezeni and Mihăilești. There are dams also on its tributaries.

== Tributaries ==
The following rivers are tributaries to the river Argeș (from source to mouth):

- Left tributaries: Braia, Mândra, Buda, Valea cu Pești, Valea Lupului, Berindești, Valea Iașului, Sasu, Vâlsan, Râul Doamnei, Izvorani, Vrănești, Râncăciov, Cârcinov, Budișteanca, Sabar, Dâmbovița, Rasa, and Luica.
- Right tributaries: Paltinul, Lespezi, Modrugaz, Cumpăna, Valea lui Stan, Arefu, Bănești (Cicănești), Valea Danului, Tutana, Schiau, Bascov and Neajlov.

== See also ==
- List of longest rivers of Romania
- Battle of the Argeș
