= Corbeni =

- Commune
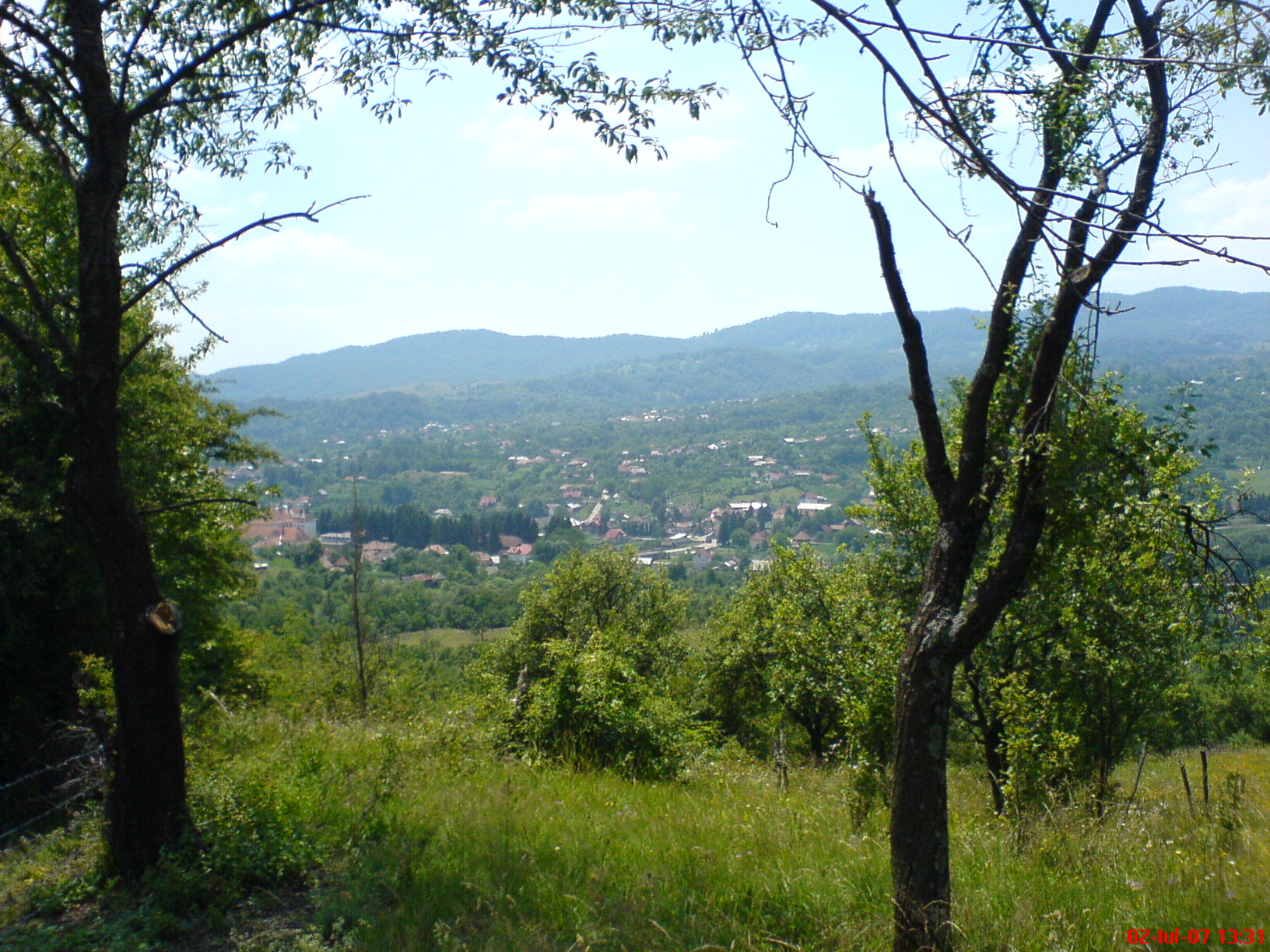
- Corbeni village

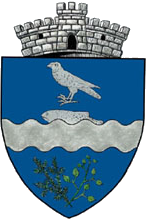
- Coat of arms

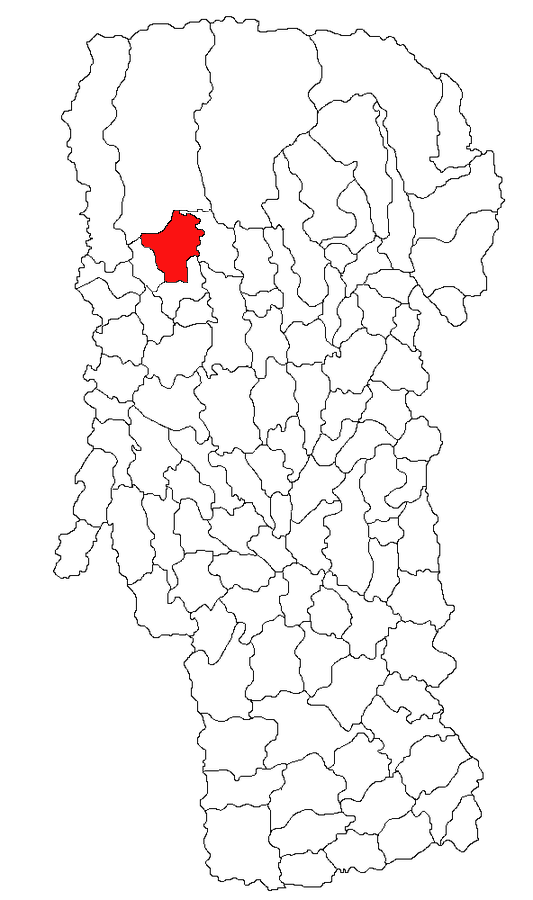
- Location in Argeș County

- Location in Romania
- Coordinates: 45°18′39″N 24°39′3″E
- Country: Romania
- County: Argeș

Government
  - Mayor (2024–2028): Nicolae Dinică (PSD)
- Area: 61.84 km^{2} (23.88 sq mi)
- Elevation: 575 m (1,886 ft)
- Highest elevation: 1,227 m (4,026 ft)
- Population (2021-12-01): 5,255
  - Density: 84.98/km^{2} (220.1/sq mi)
- Time zone: UTC+02:00 (EET)
  - Summer (DST): UTC+03:00 (EEST)
- Postal code: 117275
- Area code: +(40) 248
- Vehicle reg.: AG
- Website: www.primariacorbeni.ro

Corbeni is a commune in Argeș County, Muntenia, Romania. It is composed of eight villages: Berindești, Bucșenești, Corbeni, Oeștii Pământeni, Oeștii Ungureni, Poienari, Rotunda, and Tulburea.

The commune is situated in a hilly region in the southern foothills of the Făgăraș Mountains, on the banks of the Argeș River. It is located in the northwestern part of Argeș County, 20 km (12 mi) north of Curtea de Argeș and 55 km (34 mi) from the county seat, Pitești. It is crossed south to north by the Transfăgărășan mountain road (DN7C), which climbs to nearby Lake Vidraru, and then crosses the Southern Carpathians, reaching an altitude of 2,042 m (6,699 ft).

== Natives ==
- Vasile Tonoiu (1941–2023), philosopher and academic
