= Urechești =

Urecheşti may refer to several places in Romania:

- Urecheşti, a commune in Bacău County
- Urecheşti, a commune in Vrancea County
- Urecheşti, a village in Cicănești Commune, Argeș County
- Urecheşti, a village in Mischii Commune, Dolj County
- Urecheşti, a village in Drăguțești Commune, Gorj County
