= Limpedea (disambiguation) =

Limpedea may refer to the following rivers in Romania:

- Limpedea, a tributary of the Trebeș in Bacău County
- Limpedea, a tributary of the Băița in Maramureș County
- Limpedea, a tributary of the Berindești in Argeș County
- Limpedea, a tributary of the Izvorul Alb in Suceava County
