= Cumpăna (disambiguation) =

Cumpăna is a commune in Constanța County, Romania

Cumpăna may also refer to:

- Cumpăna (Argeș), a tributary of the river Argeș in Argeș County
- Cumpăna (Topolog), a tributary of the river Topolog in Argeș County
