= Valea Danului (river) =

- Location within Romania

Location
- Country: Romania
- Counties: Argeș County
- Villages: Vernești, Bănicești, Valea Danului

Physical characteristics
- Mouth: Argeș
  - location: near Curtea de Argeș
  - coordinates: 45.1666°N 24.6613°E
- Length: 11 km (6.8 mi)
- Basin size: 28 km^{2} (11 sq mi)

Basin features
- Progression: Argeș→ Danube→ Black Sea

The Valea Danului is a right tributary of the river Argeș in Romania. It flows into the Argeș near Curtea de Argeș. Its length is 11 km (6.8 mi) and its basin size is 28 km^{2} (11 sq mi).
