= Tutana =

- Location within Romania

Location
- Country: Romania
- Counties: Argeș County
- Villages: Tutana

Physical characteristics
- Mouth: Argeș
  - location: Mănicești
  - coordinates: 45.0272°N 24.7028°E
- Length: 12 km (7.5 mi)
- Basin size: 33 km^{2} (13 sq mi)

Basin features
- Progression: Argeș→ Danube→ Black Sea
- Tributaries
  - left: Tutănița

The Tutana is a right tributary of the river Argeș in Romania. It flows into the Argeș in Mănicești. Its length is 12 km (7.5 mi) and its basin size is 33 km^{2} (13 sq mi).
