= Bănești (Argeș) =

Bănești Cicănești
- Location within Romania

Location
- Country: Romania
- Counties: Argeș County
- Villages: Bărăști, Cicănești, Dobrotu

Physical characteristics
- Mouth: Argeș
  - location: Dobrotu
  - coordinates: 45.2191°N 24.6532°E
- Length: 14 km (8.7 mi)
- Basin size: 39 km^{2} (15 sq mi)

Basin features
- Progression: Argeș→ Danube→ Black Sea

The Bănești or Cicănești is a right tributary of the river Argeș in Romania. It flows into the Argeș in Dobrotu. Its length is 14 km (8.7 mi) and its basin size is 39 km^{2} (15 sq mi).
