= Buda (Argeș) =

- Location within Romania

Location
- Country: Romania
- Counties: Argeș County

Physical characteristics
- Source: Lake Buda
  - location: Făgăraș Mountains
- Mouth: Argeș
  - location: Lake Vidraru
  - coordinates: 45.433°N 24.617°E

Basin features
- Progression: Argeș→ Danube→ Black Sea
- Tributaries
  - left: Izvorul Mircii, Oticu
  - right: Râiosu, Mușeteica, Cornea

The Buda is a left tributary of the Argeș River in Romania. It flows into the Vidraru reservoir, which is drained by the Argeș. Its length is 19 km (12 mi) and its basin size is 101 km^{2} (39 sq mi).
