= Valea Danului =

- Commune
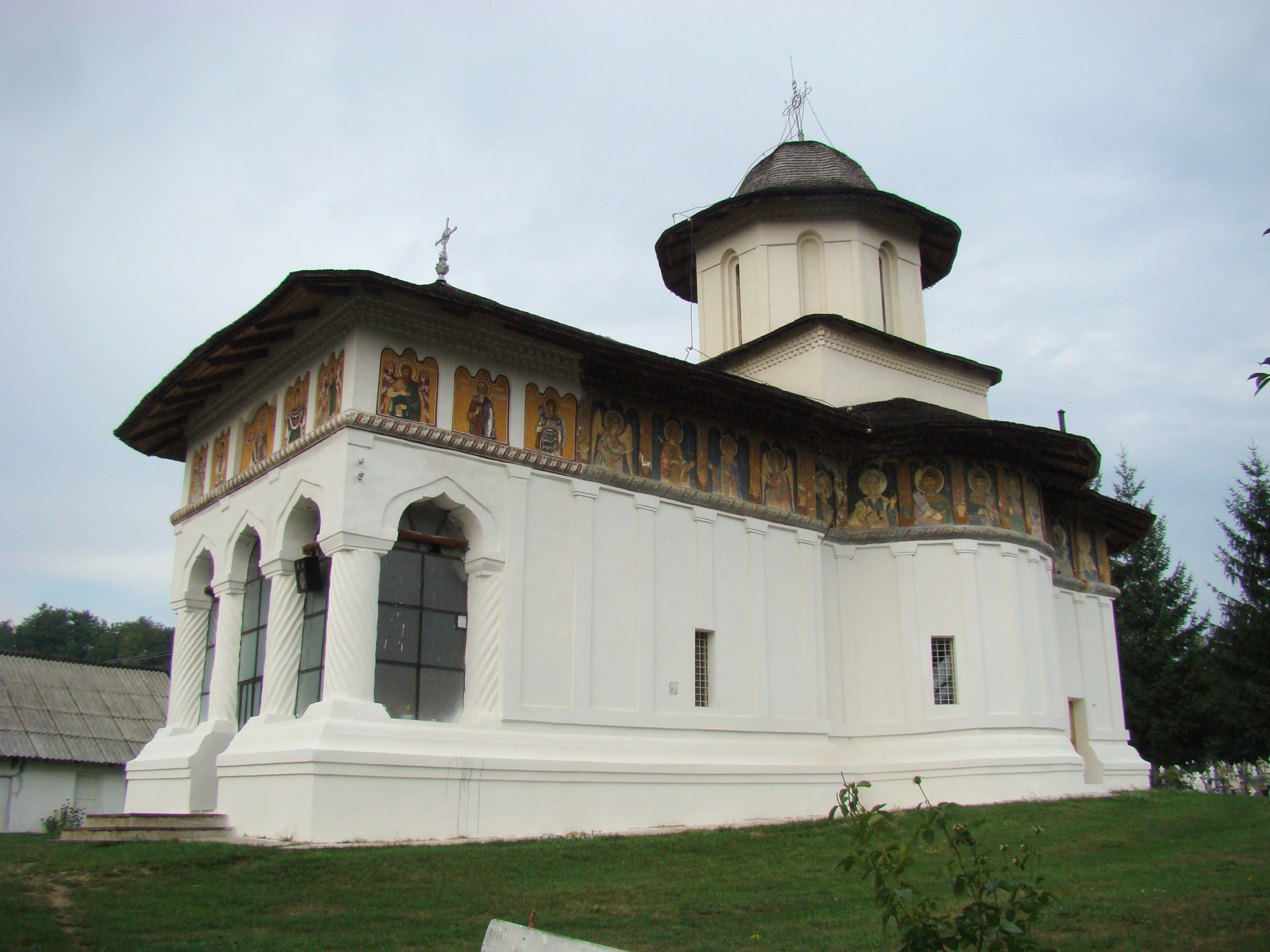
- Saint Filofteia's Church in Valea Danului

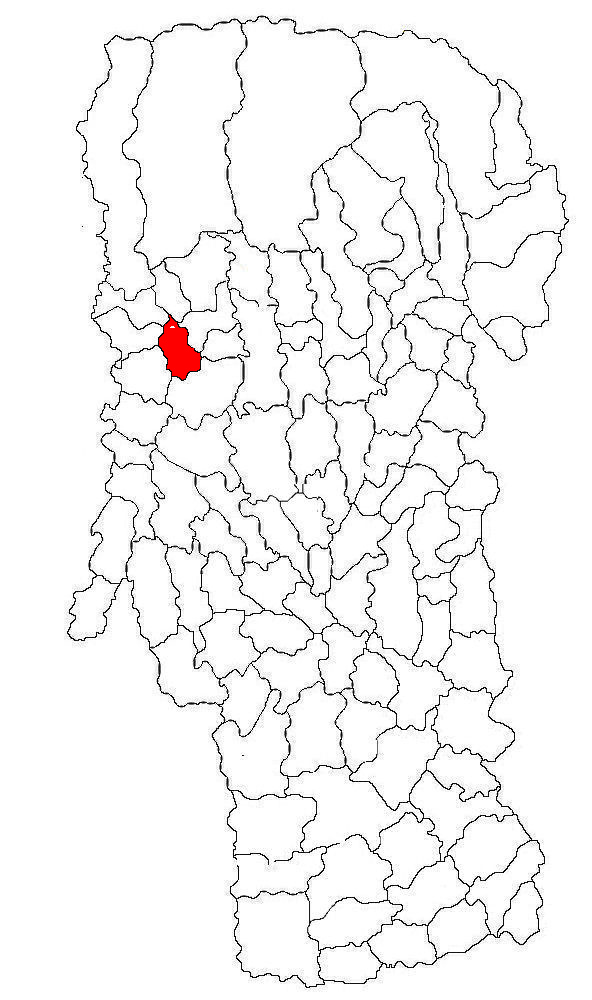
- Location in Argeș County

- Location in Romania
- Coordinates: 45°11′N 24°39′E
- Country: Romania
- County: Argeș

Government
  - Mayor (2020–2024): Vasile Preda (PNL)
- Area: 31.36 km^{2} (12.11 sq mi)
- Elevation: 481 m (1,578 ft)
- Population (2021-12-01): 2,789
  - Density: 88.93/km^{2} (230.3/sq mi)
- Time zone: UTC+02:00 (EET)
  - Summer (DST): UTC+03:00 (EEST)
- Postal code: 117790
- Area code: +(40) 248
- Vehicle reg.: AG

Valea Danului is a commune in Argeș County, Muntenia, Romania. It is composed of five villages: Bănicești, Bolculești, Borobănești, Valea Danului, and Vernești.

The commune is situated in the southern foothills of the Făgăraș Mountains, at an altitude of 481 m (1,578 ft), on the banks of the Valea Danului River. It is located in the northwestern part of Argeș County, 7 km (4.3 mi) from Curtea de Argeș and 44 km (27 mi) from the county seat, Pitești.
