= Izvorul Mircii =

Izvorul Mircii Izvorul Mircea
- Location within Romania

Location
- Country: Romania
- Counties: Argeș County

Physical characteristics
- Source: Făgăraș Mountains
- Mouth: Buda
  - coordinates: 45.5565°N 24.6823°E
- Length: 7 km (4.3 mi)
- Basin size: 22 km^{2} (8.5 sq mi)

Basin features
- Progression: Buda→ Argeș→ Danube→ Black Sea

The Izvorul Mircii or Izvorul Mircea is a left tributary of the river Buda in Romania. Its source is on the western slope of Moldoveanu Peak (Făgăraș Mountains), the highest mountain peak in Romania. Its length is 7 km (4.3 mi) and its basin size is 22 km^{2} (8.5 sq mi).
