= Vasile Tonoiu =

Romanian philosopher (1941–2023)

- Born: 3 February 1941; Corbeni, Argeș County, Kingdom of Romania
- Died: 9 June 2023 (aged 82)
- Education: University of Bucharest
- Occupation: Professor of Philosophy at the University of Bucharest
- Years active: 1972–2023

Vasile Tonoiu (3 February 1941 – 9 June 2023) was a Romanian philosopher, professor at the Faculty of Philosophy of the University of Bucharest and titular member of the Romanian Academy since 2003.

After completing high school in Curtea de Argeș, he studied philosophy at the University of Bucharest, and obtained his Ph.D. degree in 1971. The next year he was awarded the Vasile Conta Prize of the Romanian Academy.

Tonoiu died on 9 June 2023, at the age of 82.

== Translations ==
- Alexandre Koyré, translated by Vasile Tonoiu and Anca Baluta-Skultely, La lumea închisă a universului infinit, Bucharest, Humanitas, 1997.
- Gaston Bachelard, translated by Vasile Tonoiu, Dialectica spiritului științific modern, Bucharest, Scientific and Encyclopedic Publishing House, 1986.
- Paul Ricœur, translated by Vasile Tonoiu, Eseuri de hermeneutică, Bucharest, Humanitas, 1995.

== Works ==
- Idoneismul filosofie a deschiderii, București, Editura Politică, 1972
- Dialectică și relativism, București, Editura Științifică și Enciclopedică, 1978
- Ontologii arhaice în actualitate, București, Editura Științifică și Enciclopedică, 1989
- Dialog filozofic și filozofie a dialogului, București, Editura Științifică, 1997
- In căutarea unei paradigme a complexității, Editura Iri, 1997
- Ințelepciune versus filosofie, București, Editura Academiei Române, 2007
- Altfel de proze, seria Filozofie, Editura Paideia

== See also ==
- Buse, Ionel (28 June 2013). "Vasile Tonoiu et l'esprit scientifique moderne: une approche roumaine de Gaston Bachelard". Revue de Synthèse. 134 (3): 329–342. doi:10.1007/s11873-013-0228-5.
