= Valea lui Stan (disambiguation) =

Valea lui Stan may refer to the following places in Romania:

- Valea lui Stan, a tributary of the Argeș in Argeș County
- Valea lui Stan, a tributary of the Lotru in Vâlcea County
- Valea lui Stan, a village in the town Brezoi, Vâlcea County
