= Valea cu Pești =

- Location within Romania

Location
- Country: Romania
- Counties: Argeș County

Physical characteristics
- Mouth: Argeș
  - location: Lake Vidraru
  - coordinates: 45.4041°N 24.6429°E
- Length: 10 km (6.2 mi)
- Basin size: 23 km^{2} (8.9 sq mi)

Basin features
- Progression: Argeș→ Danube→ Black Sea

The Valea cu Pești is a left tributary of the river Argeș in Romania. It discharges into Lake Vidraru, which is drained by the Argeș. Its length is 10 km (6.2 mi) and its basin size is 23 km^{2} (8.9 sq mi).
