= Râncăciov (river) =

- Location within Romania

Location
- Country: Romania
- Counties: Argeș County

Physical characteristics
- Mouth: Argeș
  - location: Catanele
  - coordinates: 44.8015°N 25.0227°E
- Length: 25 km (16 mi)
- Basin size: 65 km^{2} (25 sq mi)

Basin features
- Progression: Argeș→ Danube→ Black Sea
- Tributaries
  - right: Lăpuș

The Râncăciov is a left tributary of the river Argeș in Romania. It discharges into the Argeș near Catanele. It flows through the towns and villages Valea Corbului, Cârstieni, Urlucea and Râncăciov. Its length is 25 km (16 mi) and its basin size is 65 km^{2} (25 sq mi).
