= Robert Geantă =

Romanian footballer

Personal information
- Full name: Robert Mihai Geantă
- Date of birth: 7 April 1997 (age 29)
- Place of birth: Călinești, Romania
- Height: 1.89 m (6 ft 2 in)
- Position: Goalkeeper

Team information
- Current team: ASA Târgu Mureș
- Number: 1

Youth career
- Sporting Pitești

Senior career*
Years	Team	Apps	(Gls)
2015–2016	Altamura		
2016–2017	Înainte Modelu		
2017–2020	Metaloglobus București	47	(0)
2020–2021	CSM Focșani		
2021–2024	Viitorul Târgu Jiu	21	(0)
2024–2025	Unirea Ungheni	26	(0)
2025–	ASA Târgu Mureș	19	(0)
- * Club domestic league appearances and goals as of 31 October 2026

Robert Mihai Geantă (born 7 April 1997) is a Romanian professional footballer who plays as a goalkeeper for Liga II club ASA Târgu Mureș.
