= Anghel Andreescu =

Romanian general

Anghel Andreescu (born 5 September 1950) is a four-star general, and a member of the Academy of Romanian Scientists, Military Department. As a general, he was involved with the country's peacekeeping efforts in Kosovo. He was also the State Secretary with the Romanian Ministry of Home Affairs and Administrative Reform (MIRA) following a tenure as state secretary for the Interior Ministry and head of Special Security Forces, a position he held for more than four years.

== Biography ==
Anghel Andreescu was born on September 5, 1950, in the village of Valea Iașului, Argeș County. After graduating from the "Vlaicu Vodă" High School of Curtea de Argeș, he studied at the Military School of Active Officers of the Ministry of Internal Affairs, and then, at the Military Army (1972–1975), then at the Faculty of Law of the University of Bucharest (1972–1977) and at the Faculty Combined Arms at the Academy of High Military Studies in Bucharest (1982–1984).

Later, he graduated from a postgraduate course in criminal law at the Faculty of Law of the University of Bucharest, and in 1995 he obtained a Ph.D. in Military Sciences.

After graduating from the School of Officers in 1975, he worked in the Ministry of Internal Affairs, being the commander of the company and battalion of students at the Military Petty Officer School (nowadays, the "Nicolae Golescu" Police Training Center) in Slatina from 1975 to 1982. Then, he continued his education at the Military Academy and in 1984 came back to the Police Training Center where he had the positions of the Specialist Officer III, then of the head of the department and the Chief of Staff. From 1999 to 2001, Andreescu was commander of the Romanian Gendarmerie.

He is the godfather of the Director of SPP (Romanian Secret Service), Gen. Lucian Pahonțu.
