= Vidraru Dam =

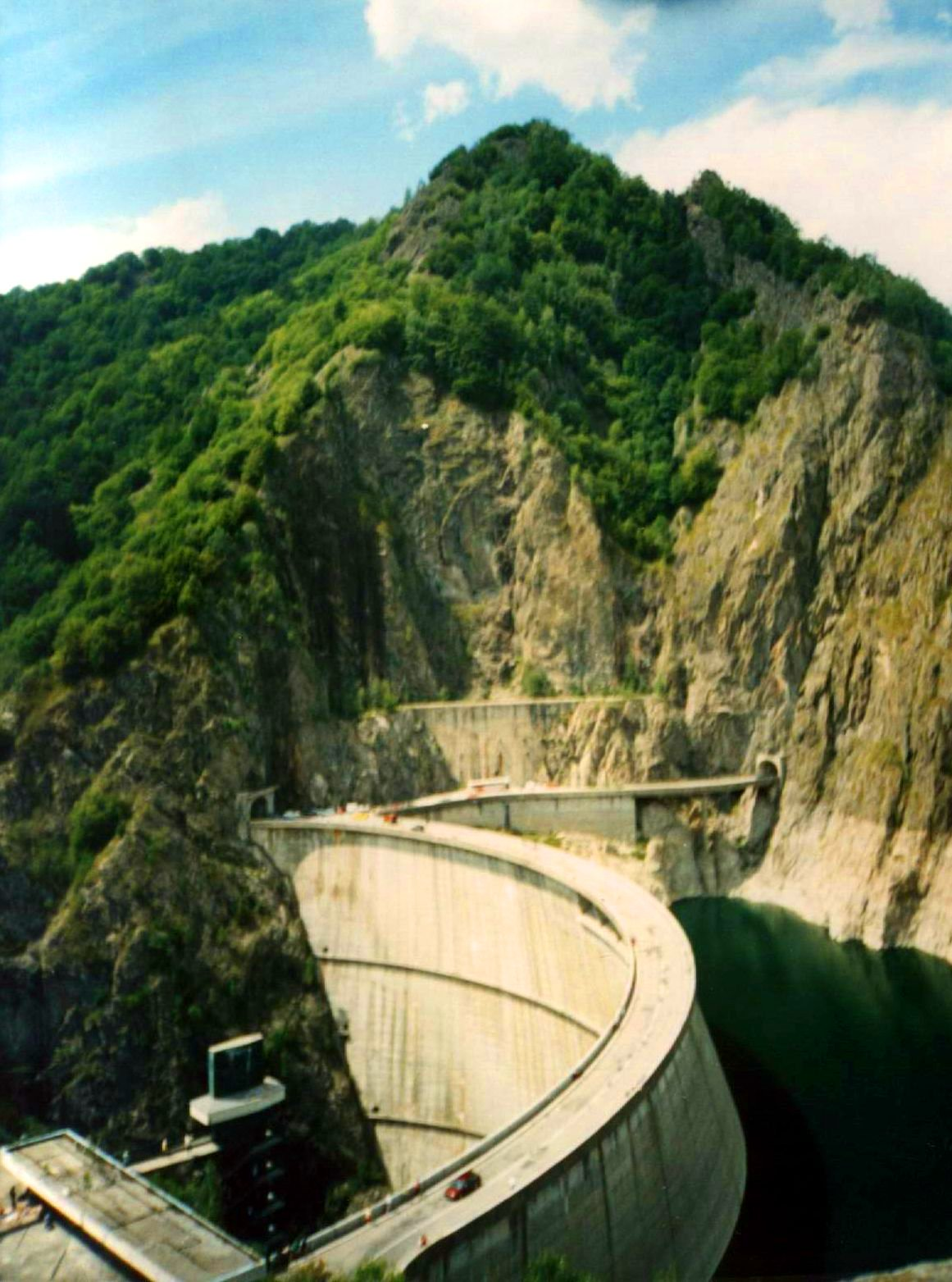
- The Vidraru dam
- Interactive map of Vidraru Dam
- Location: Argeș River, Argeș County; Romania
- Coordinates: 45°21′58.5″N 24°37′47.28″E
- Construction began: 1960
- Opening date: 1966

Dam and spillways
- Impounds: Argeș River
- Height: 166 m (545 ft)
- Length: 305 m (1,001 ft)
- Dam volume: 480,000 m^{3} (630,000 cu yd)

Reservoir
- Creates: Lake Vidraru
- Total capacity: 0.465 km^{3} (0.112 mi^{3})
- Catchment area: 286 km^{2} (110 mi^{2})
- Surface area: 10 km^{2} (3.9 mi^{2})

Power Station
- Commission date: 9 December 1966
- Turbines: 4 x 55 MW Francis-type
- Installed capacity: 220 MW
- Annual generation: 400 GWh

Vidraru Dam is a dam in Romania. It was completed in 1966 on the Argeș River and creates Lake Vidraru. The arch dam was built with the primary purpose to produce hydroelectricity. The dam's height is 166 metres, the arch length 305 meters and it can store 465 million cubic metres of water. The reservoir has a total shoreline (perimeter) length of 28 km.

== Background ==
Electricitate (Electricity), statue from Constantin Popovici above the dam.

Located between Frunții Mountains and Ghițu mountains, the lake collects the Capra, Buda, and some other smaller rivers (Râul Doamnei, Cernatu, Vâlsan, Topolog, Valea lui Stan, and Limpedea), with a total flow of about 5.5 thousands L/s. The total surface of the lake is 3,930,000 sq m, 10.3 km in length, with a maximum width of 2.2 km in the Valea Lupului – Călugărița zone. Normal level or water retention is 830 metres above sea level (mdM).

The dam's construction took 5 and a half years. It required 42 km of tunnels, excavation of 1,768,000 cubic metres of hard rocks, out of which approximatively 1 million had to be extracted from underground, 930,000 cubic metres of concrete, out of which 400,000 cubic metres were underground and required the installation of 6,300 tons of electro-mechanical equipment.

When completed, it ranked 5th in Europe, and 9th in the world. In an average hydrological year it can generate approximately of 400 GWh/year. As of 2019, Vidraru Dam is the 16th tallest dam in Europe.

The Vidraru Hydro Power Plant has an installed capacity of 220 MW.

Above the Dam, on the left bank, a sculpture by Constantin Popovici called Electricitate dominates the landscape.

== See also ==
- Energy in Romania

== Gallery ==
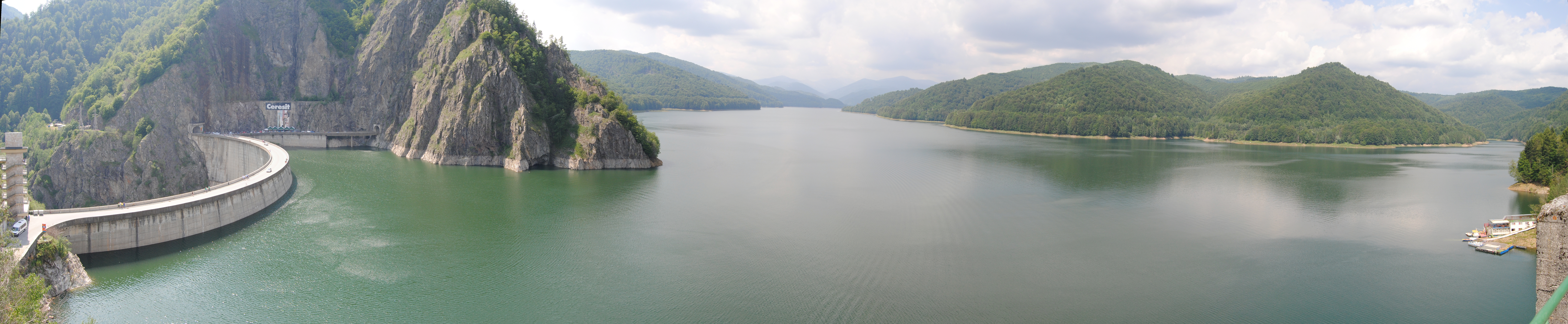
Vidraru Lake and Dam, 2012-07-01
