= Cumpăna (Argeș) =

- Location within Romania

Location
- Country: Romania
- Counties: Argeș County

Physical characteristics
- Mouth: Argeș
  - location: Lake Vidraru
  - coordinates: 45.4369°N 24.5960°E
- Length: 7 km (4.3 mi)
- Basin size: 28 km^{2} (11 sq mi)

Basin features
- Progression: Argeș→ Danube→ Black Sea
- Tributaries
  - left: Cumpănița

The Cumpăna is a right tributary of the river Argeș in Romania. It discharges into Lake Vidraru, which is drained by the Argeș. Its length is 7 km (4.3 mi) and its basin size is 28 km^{2} (11 sq mi).
