= Berindești =

- Location within Romania

Location
- Country: Romania
- Counties: Argeș County
- Villages: Berindești, Poienari

Physical characteristics
- Mouth: Argeș
  - coordinates: 45.3075°N 24.6522°E
- Length: 7 km (4.3 mi)
- Basin size: 36 km^{2} (14 sq mi)

Basin features
- Progression: Argeș→ Danube→ Black Sea
- Tributaries
  - left: Turburea
  - right: Limpedea

The Berindești is a left tributary of the river Argeș in Romania. It flows into the Argeș in Poienari. Its length is 7 km (4.3 mi) and its basin size is 36 km^{2} (14 sq mi).
