= Valea lui Stan =

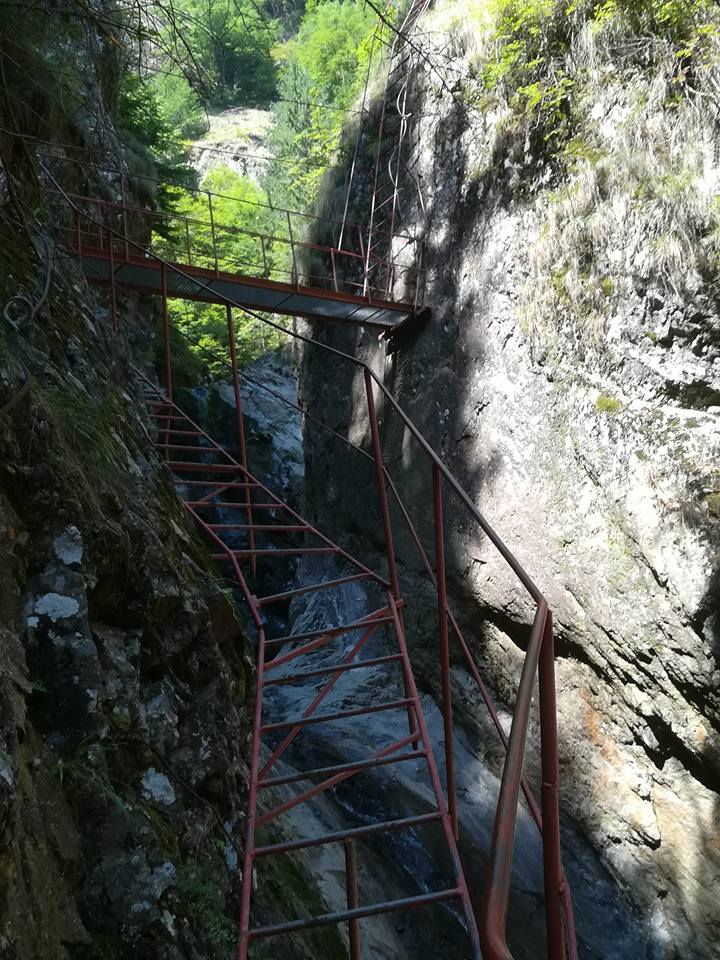

- Location within Romania

Location
- Country: Romania
- Counties: Argeș County

Physical characteristics
- Mouth: Argeș
  - location: downstream of Vidraru Dam
  - coordinates: 45.3574°N 24.6275°E
- Length: 12 km (7.5 mi)
- Basin size: 21 km^{2} (8.1 sq mi)

Basin features
- Progression: Argeș→ Danube→ Black Sea

The Valea lui Stan is a right tributary of the river Argeș in Romania. It flows into the Argeș downstream of the Vidraru Dam. Its length is 12 km (7.5 mi) and its basin size is 21 km^{2} (8.1 sq mi).
