= Mihail Andreescu-Skeletty =

Romanian composer

- Born: 8 June 1882; Iași, Romania
- Died: 19 July 1965 (aged 83); Cluj, Romania

Mihail Andreescu-Skeletty (8 June 1882 – 19 July 1965) was a Romanian composer.
