= Arefu =

- Commune
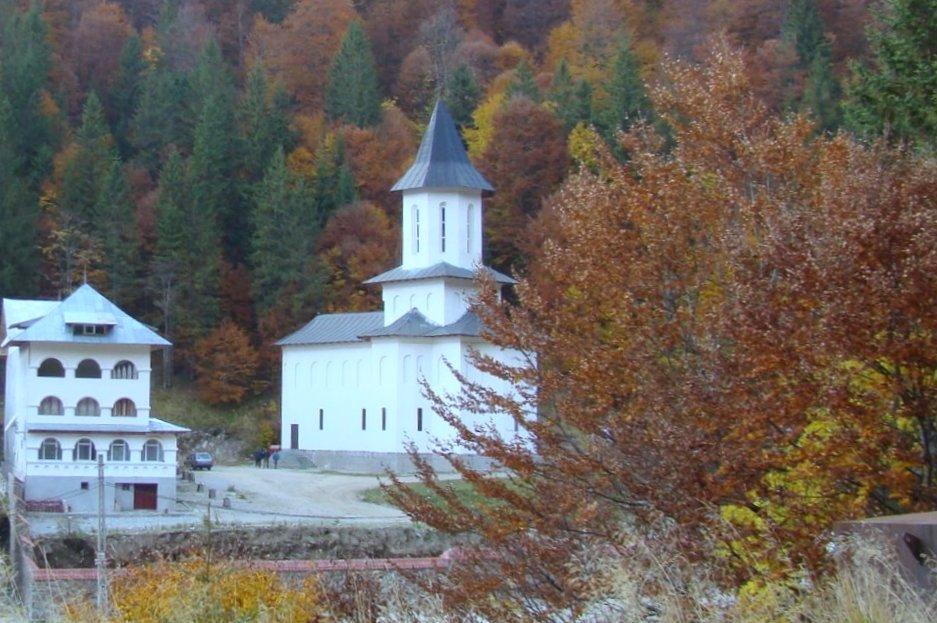
- Arefu Monastery

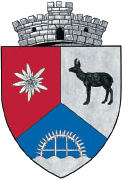
- Coat of arms

- Location in Romania
- Coordinates: 45°20′N 24°36′E
- Country: Romania
- County: Argeș

Government
  - Mayor (2024–2028): Gheorghe Stoican (PSD)
- Area: 420.25 km^{2} (162.26 sq mi)
- Elevation: 718 m (2,356 ft)
- Population (2021-12-01): 2,040
  - Density: 4.85/km^{2} (12.6/sq mi)
- Time zone: UTC+02:00 (EET)
  - Summer (DST): UTC+03:00 (EEST)
- Postal code: 117040
- Area code: (+40) 0248
- Vehicle reg.: AG
- Website: www.cjarges.ro/en/web/arefu

Arefu is a commune in Argeș County, Muntenia, Romania. It is composed of three villages: Arefu, Căpățânenii Pământeni (the commune center), and Căpățânenii Ungureni.

Historical population
Year	Pop.	±%
2002	2,786	—
2011	2,405	−13.7%
2021	2,040	−15.2%
Source: Census data

== In popular culture ==
- In the game Fallout 3, a settlement in the Capital Wasteland shares its name with Arefu, and is involved in a quest involving faux-vampirism, in reference to the real Arefu's proximity to the Poenari Castle of Vlad the Impaler.
