= Căteasca =

- Commune
- Location in Romania
- Coordinates: 44.7667°N 25.0833°E
- Country: Romania
- County: Argeș
- Population (2021-12-01): 3,716
- Time zone: EET/EEST (UTC+2/+3)
- Vehicle reg.: AG

Căteasca is a commune in Argeș County, Muntenia, Romania. It is composed of seven villages: Catanele, Căteasca, Cireșu, Coșeri, Gruiu, Recea and Siliștea.
