= Bărăști =

- Commune
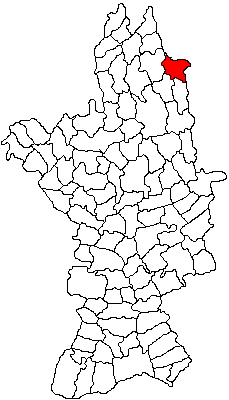
- Location in Olt County

- Location in Romania
- Coordinates: 44.7058°N 24.6459°E
- Country: Romania
- County: Olt
- Population (2021-12-01): 1,369
- Time zone: EET/EEST (UTC+2/+3)
- Vehicle reg.: OT

Bărăști is a commune in Olt County, Muntenia, Romania. It is composed of eight villages: Bărăștii de Cepturi, Bărăștii de Vede (the commune center), Boroești, Ciocănești, Lăzărești, Mereni, Moțoești and Popești.
