= Valea Iașului =

- Commune
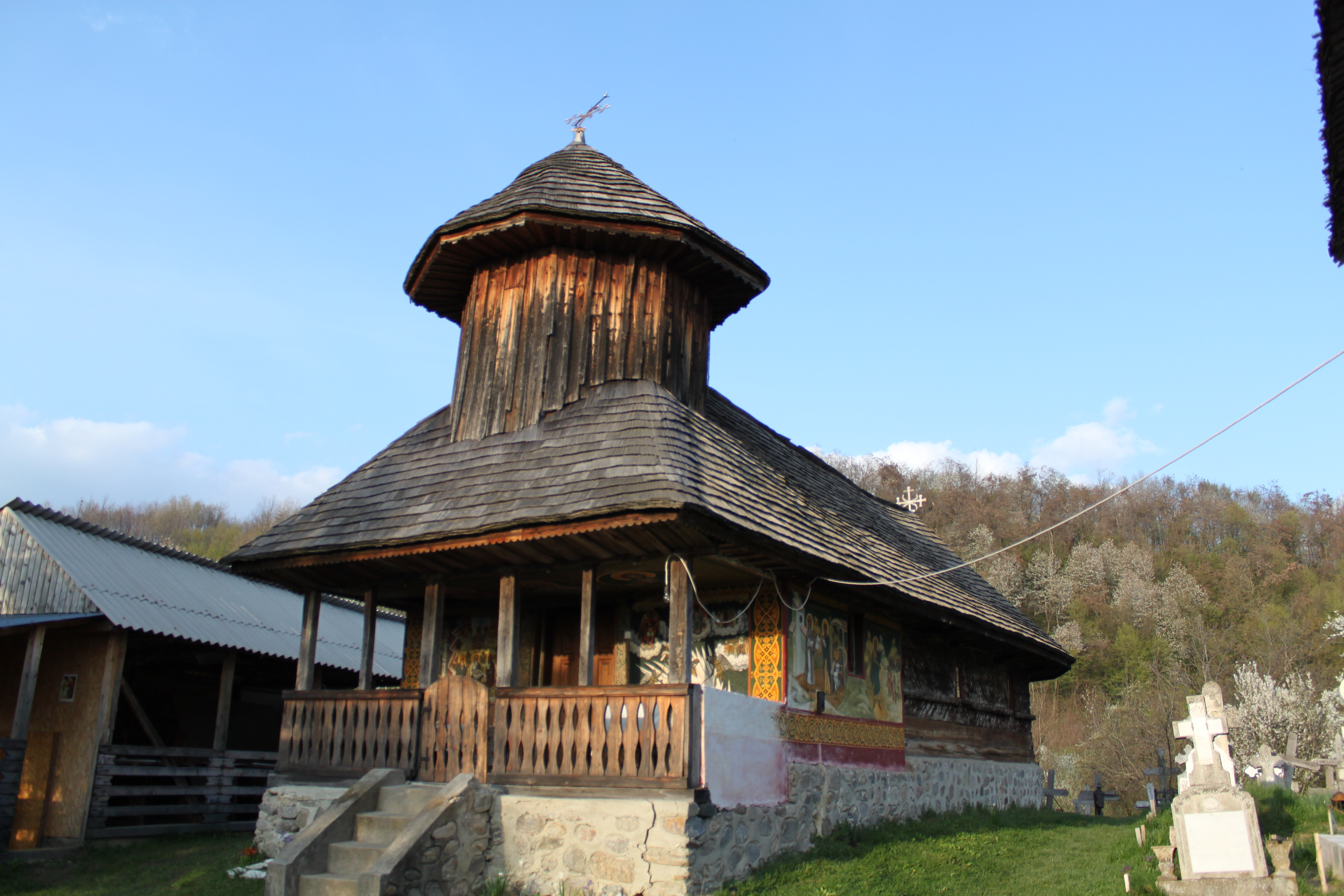
- Wooden church in Bărbălătești

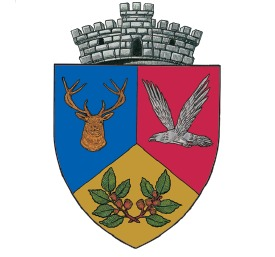
- Coat of arms

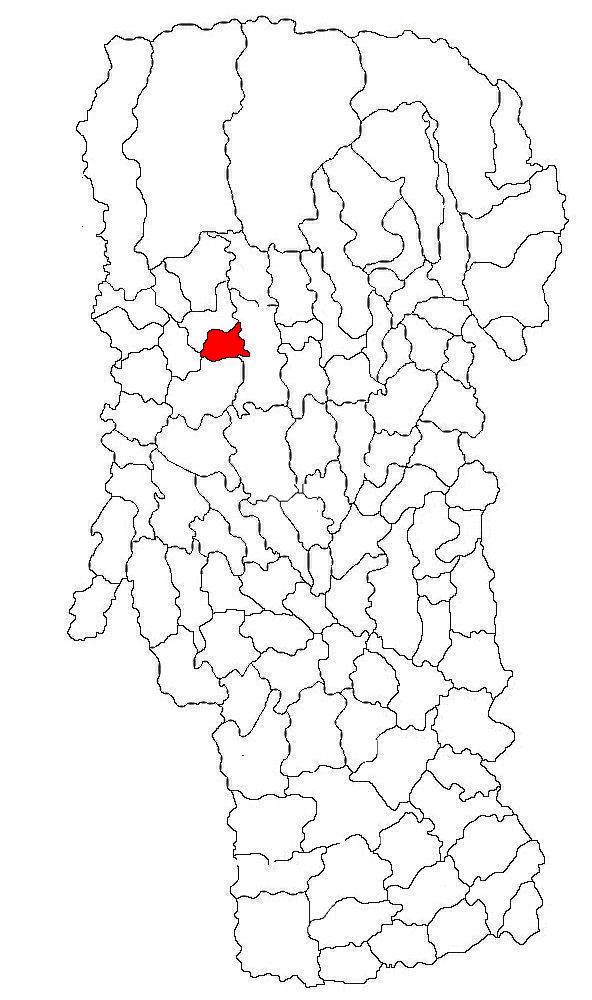
- Location in Argeș County

- Location in Romania
- Coordinates: 45°11′N 24°43′E
- Country: Romania
- County: Argeș

Government
  - Mayor (2020–2024): Cristian Enescu (PSD)
- Area: 27 km^{2} (10 sq mi)
- Elevation: 477 m (1,565 ft)
- Population (2021-12-01): 2,436
  - Density: 90/km^{2} (230/sq mi)
- Time zone: UTC+02:00 (EET)
  - Summer (DST): UTC+03:00 (EEST)
- Postal code: 117795
- Area code: +(40) 248
- Vehicle reg.: AG
- Website: comunavaleaiasului.ro

Valea Iașului is a commune in Argeș County, Muntenia, Romania. It is composed of nine villages: Bădila, Bărbălătești, Borovinești, Cerbureni, Mustățești, Ruginoasa, Ungureni, Valea Iașului, and Valea Uleiului.

== Natives ==
- Anghel Andreescu (born 1950), four-star general
