= Sălcioara, Dâmbovița =

Sălcioara
- Commune
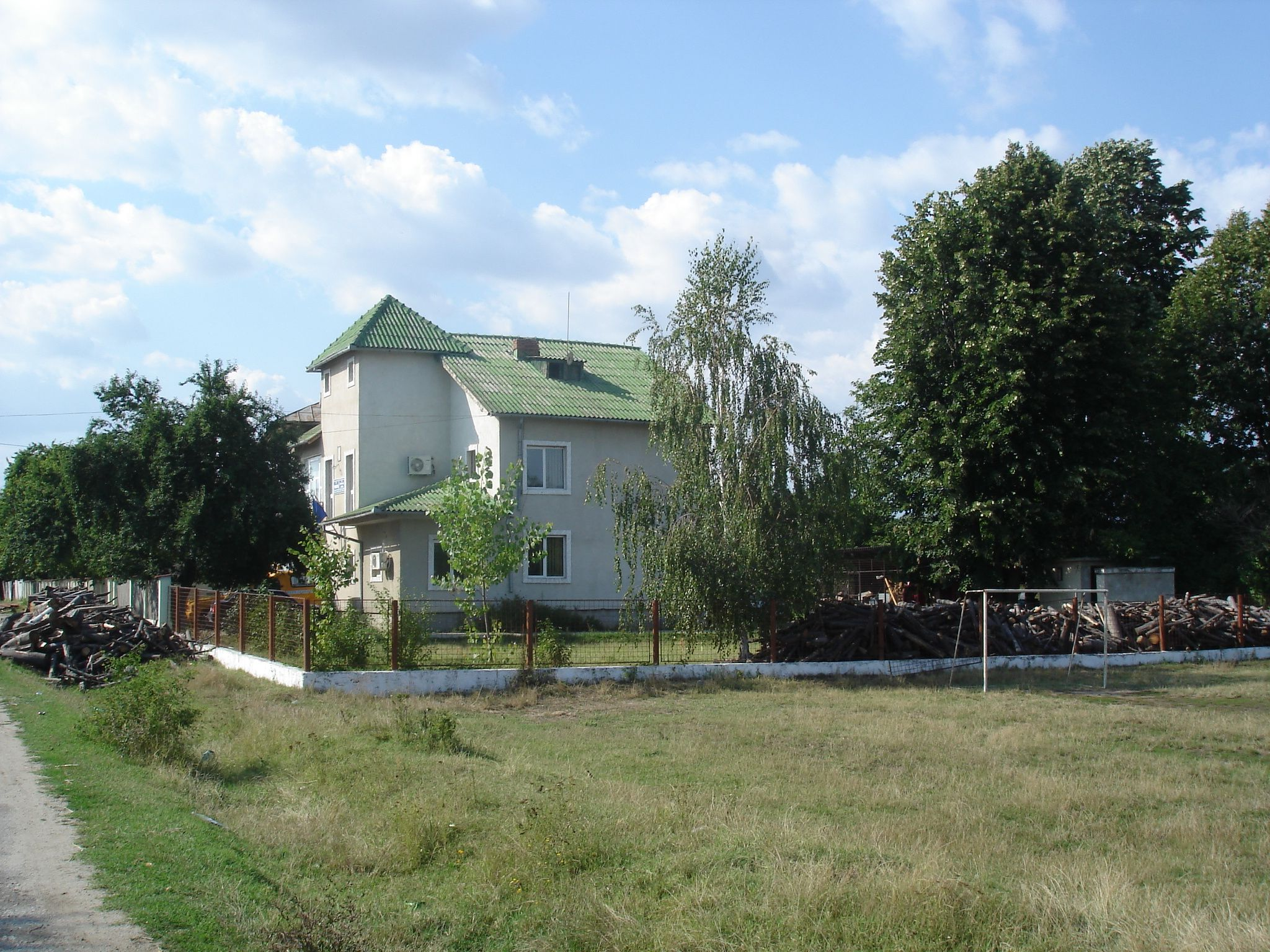
- Sălcioara town hall, in Bănești

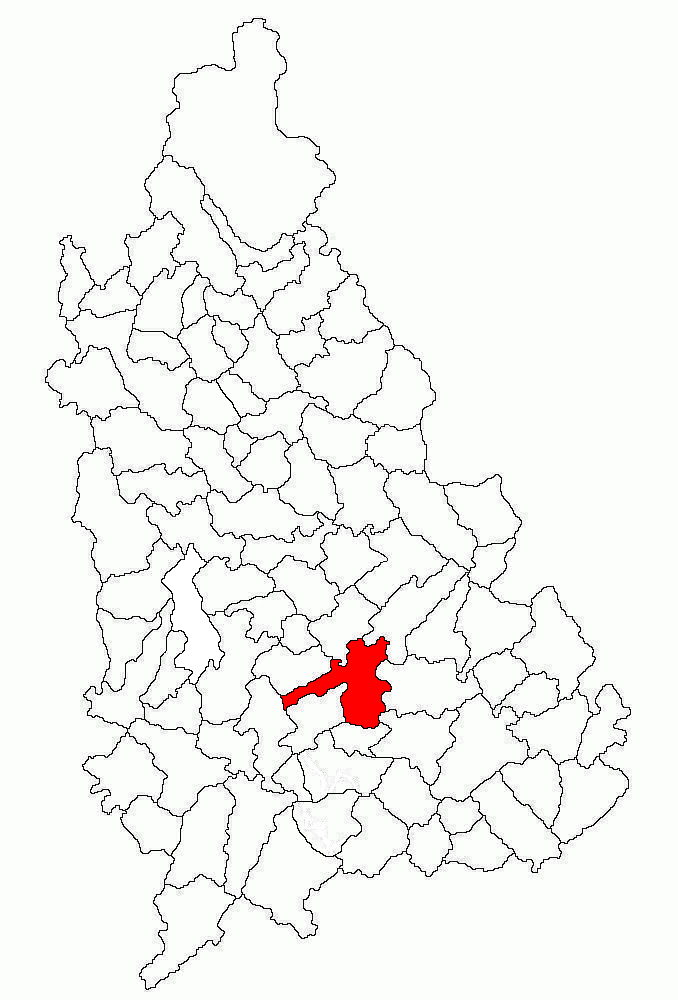
- Location in Dâmbovița County

- Location in Romania
- Coordinates: 44°43′N 25°35′E
- Country: Romania
- County: Dâmbovița

Government
  - Mayor (2024–2028): Florina Ivașcu (PNL)
- Area: 50.69 km^{2} (19.57 sq mi)
- Elevation: 181 m (594 ft)
- Population (2021-12-01): 3,742
  - Density: 73.82/km^{2} (191.2/sq mi)
- Time zone: UTC+02:00 (EET)
  - Summer (DST): UTC+03:00 (EEST)
- Postal code: 137410
- Area code: +(40) 245
- Vehicle reg.: DB
- Website: comunasalcioara.ro

Sălcioara is a commune in Dâmbovița County, Muntenia, Romania with a population of 3,742 people as of 2021. It is composed of nine villages: Bănești (the commune center), Cătunu, Cuza Vodă, Ghinești, Mircea Vodă, Moara Nouă, Movila, Podu Rizii, and Sălcioara.

Historical population
Year	Pop.	±%
2002	4,178	—
2011	4,081	−2.3%
2021	3,742	−8.3%
Source: Census data
