= Băiculești =

- Commune
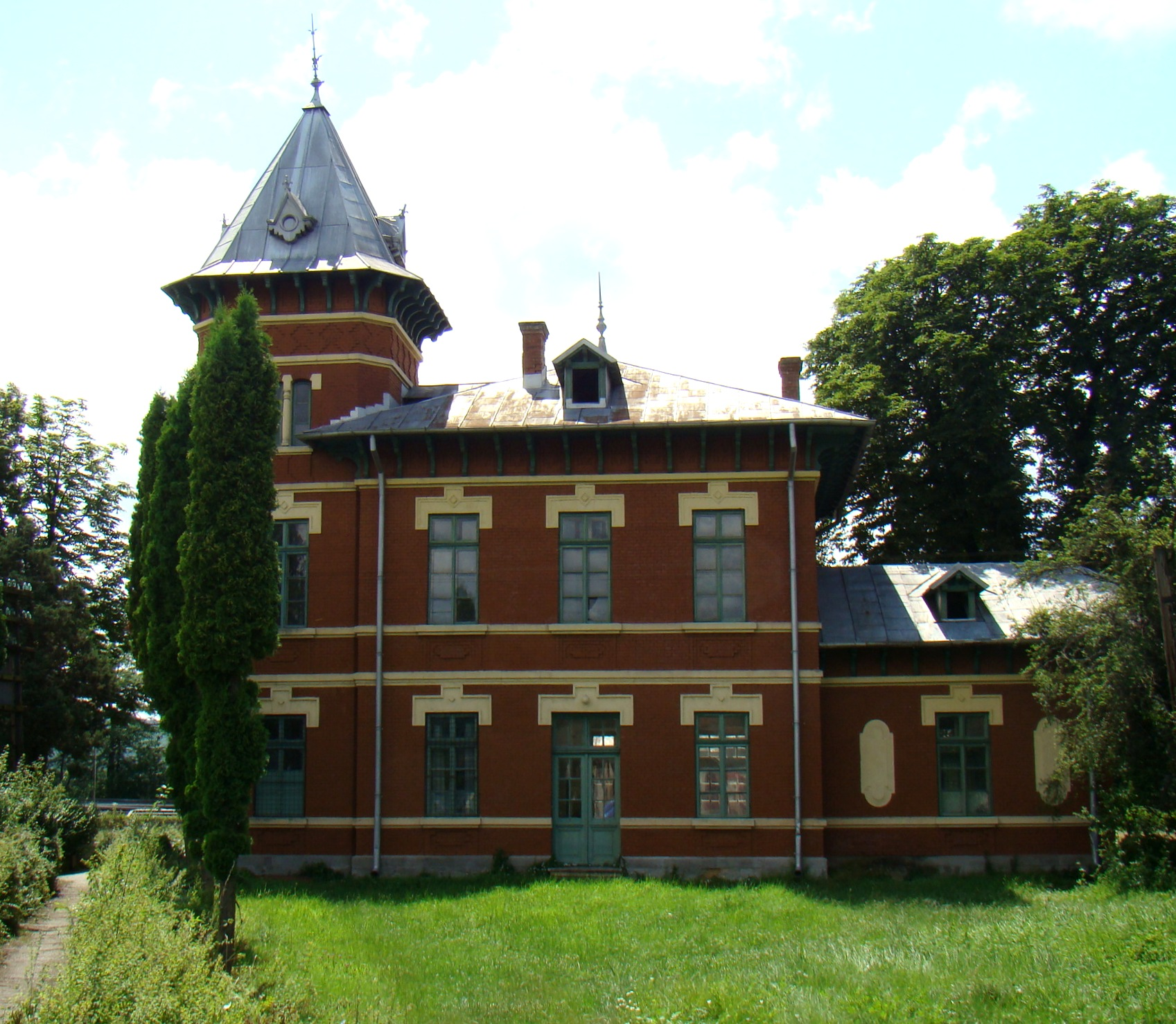
- Băiculești train station (built 1898)

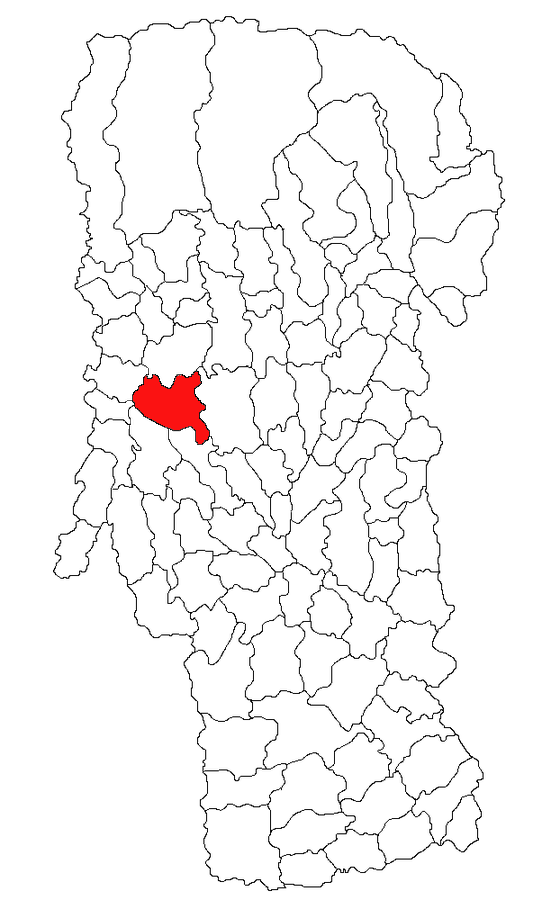
- Location in Argeș County

- Location in Romania
- Coordinates: 45°4′N 24°42′E
- Country: Romania
- County: Argeș

Government
  - Mayor (2020–2024): Niculaie Dragnea (PSD)
- Area: 76.46 km^{2} (29.52 sq mi)
- Elevation: 384 m (1,260 ft)
- Population (2021-12-01): 5,577
  - Density: 72.94/km^{2} (188.9/sq mi)
- Time zone: UTC+02:00 (EET)
  - Summer (DST): UTC+03:00 (EEST)
- Postal code: 117065
- Area code: +(40) 248
- Vehicle reg.: AG
- Website: www.cjarges.ro/en/web/baiculesti

Băiculești is a commune in Argeș County, Muntenia, Romania. It is composed of ten villages: Alunișu, Anghinești, Argeșani, Băiculești, Mănicești, Stejari, Tutana, Valea Brazilor, Valea lui Enache, and Zigoneni.

Historical population
Year	Pop.	±%
2002	6,312	—
2011	5,826	−7.7%
2021	5,577	−4.3%
Source: Census data
