= Călinești, Argeș =

Călinești
- Commune
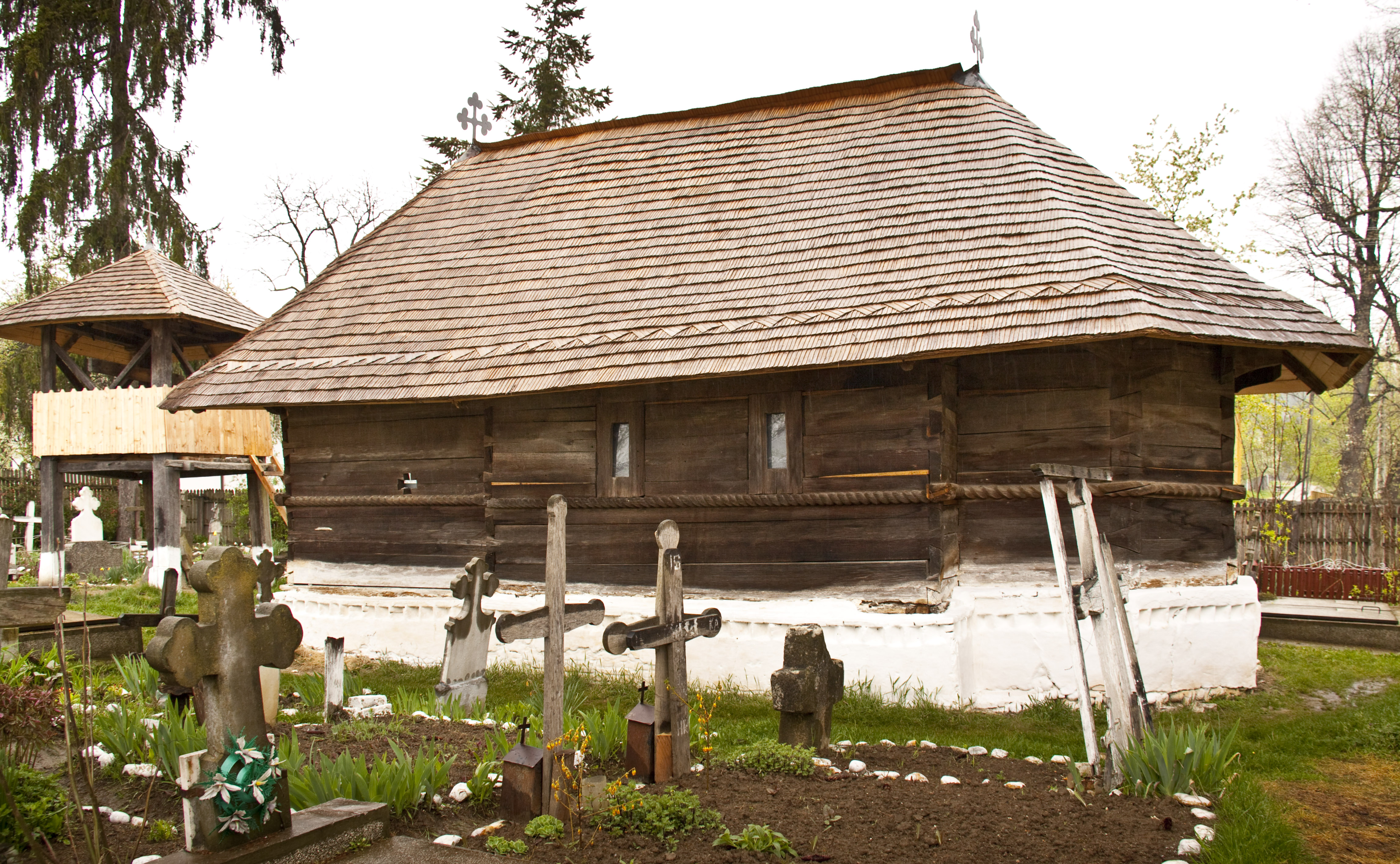
- Wooden church in Cârstieni

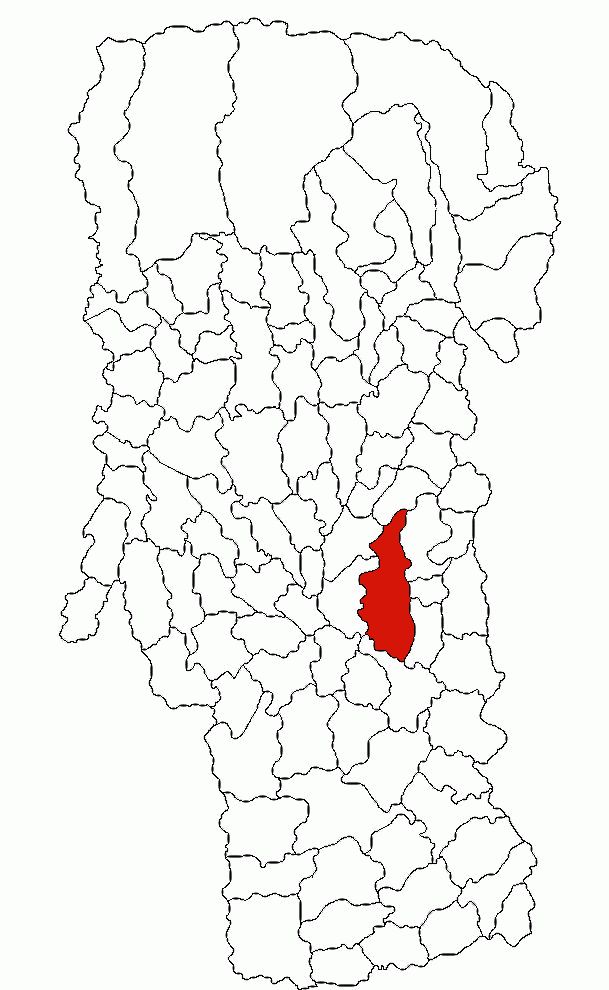
- Location in Argeș County

- Location in Romania
- Coordinates: 44°49′45″N 25°02′25″E
- Country: Romania
- County: Argeș

Government
  - Mayor (2024–2028): Alina-Ioana Georgescu (PSD)
- Area: 108.16 km^{2} (41.76 sq mi)
- Elevation: 292 m (958 ft)
- Population (2021-12-01): 10,813
  - Density: 99.972/km^{2} (258.93/sq mi)
- Time zone: UTC+02:00 (EET)
  - Summer (DST): UTC+03:00 (EEST)
- Postal code: 117210
- Area code: (+40) 0248
- Vehicle reg.: AG
- Website: primaria-calinesti.ro

Călinești (Romanian pronunciation: [kəlineʃtʲ]) is a commune in Argeș County, Muntenia, Romania. It is composed of twelve villages: Călinești, Ciocănești, Cârstieni, Glodu, Gorganu, Radu Negru, Râncăciov, Udeni-Zăvoi, Urlucea, Valea Corbului, Văleni-Podgoria, and Vrănești (the commune centre).

== History ==
In World War I, many soldiers from Călinești served in the Romanian Army; 84 of them were killed in action.

== Natives ==
- Robert Geantă (born 1997), footballer
- Gheorghe Iliescu-Călinești (1932–2002), sculptor
- Adrian Mutu (born 1979), football manager and former player
- Valentin Năstase (born 1974), footballer
- Ion Vlădoiu (born 1968), footballer
