= Lake Vidraru =

Artificial lake in Romania

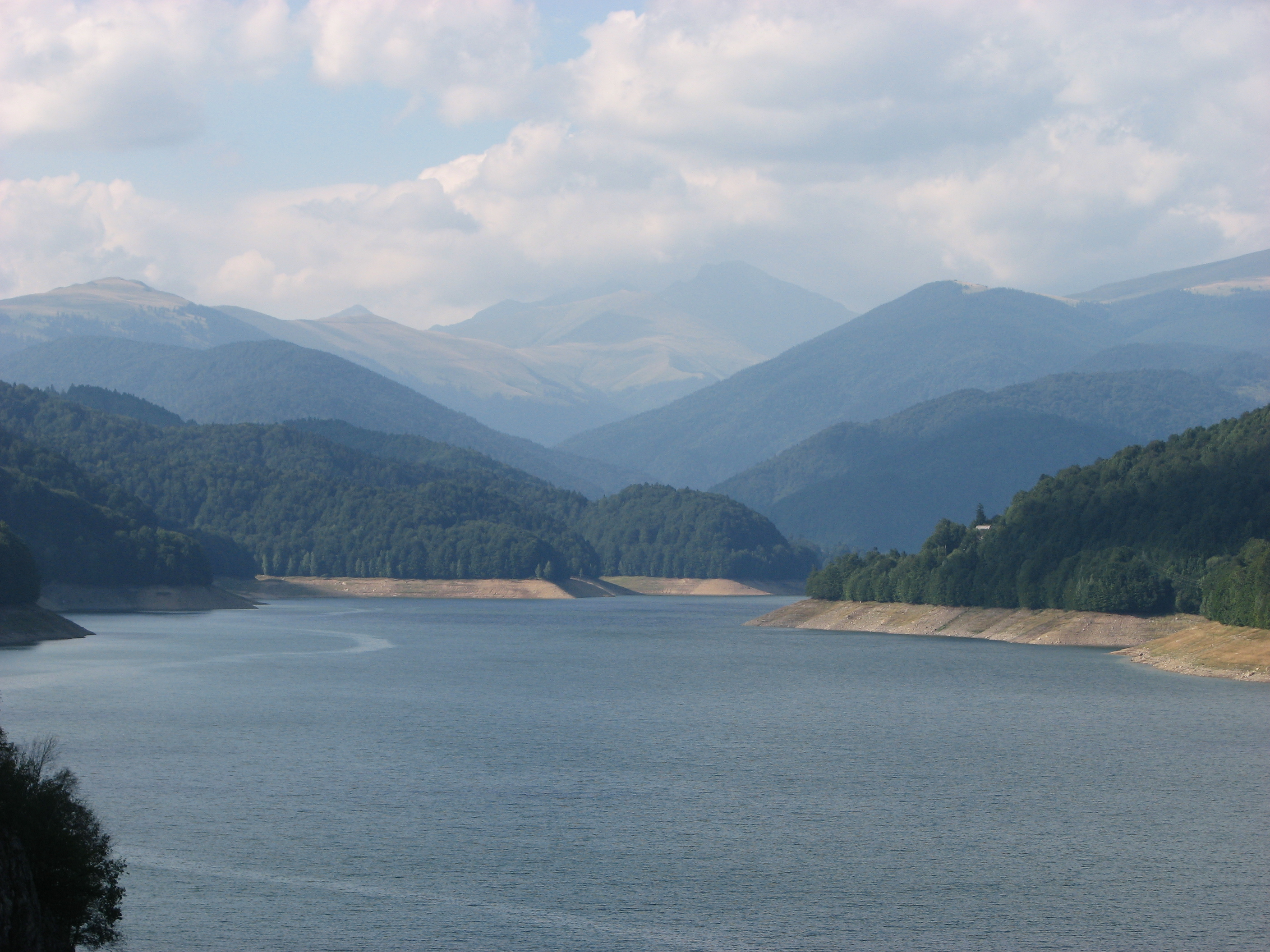

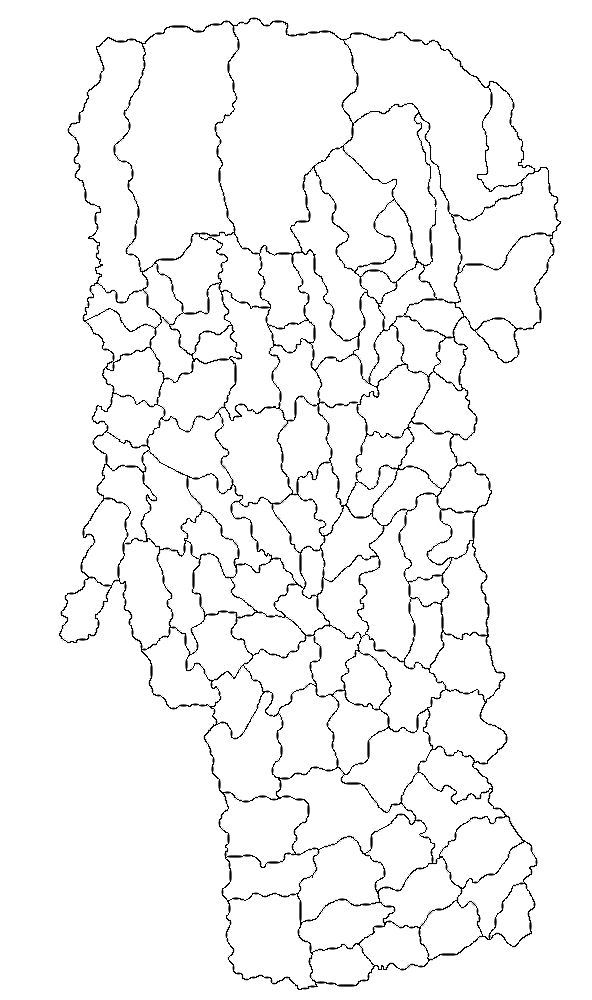
- Location within Argeș County
- Location: Romania
- Coordinates: 45°23′N 24°38′E
- Type: artificial lake
- Primary inflows: Argeș River
- Primary outflows: Argeș River
- Basin countries: Romania
- Max. length: 10.3 km (6.4 mi)
- Max. width: 1.4 km (0.87 mi)
- Surface area: 8.94 km^{2} (3.45 sq mi)
- Max. depth: 155 m (509 ft)
- Water volume: 0.48 km^{3} (390,000 acre⋅ft)
- Surface elevation: 830 m (2,720 ft)

Lake Vidraru (Romanian: Lacul Vidraru) is an artificial lake in Romania. It was created in 1965 by the construction of the Vidraru Dam on the Argeș River.

It lies in the shadow of the Făgăraș Mountains. A village lies submerged at the bottom of this lake.

Vidraru Lake is a reservoir lake created in 1965 on the Arges River for Hydroelectricity production. It has 465 million cubic metres of water, with a length of 10.3 kilometres (6.4 mi) and a width of 2.2 kilometres (1.4 mi), accumulating a total area of 870 hectares (8.7 km^{2}; 3.4 sq mi) and maximum depth of 155 metres (509 ft). Its circumference is about 28 kilometres (17 mi).

An underground power station is situated in proximity of the lake, 104 metres (341 ft) deep under the Cetatuia massif. Its annual energy production 400 gigawatt-hours (1,400 TJ) in an average hydrological year. The installed turbine capacity is 220 megawatts (300,000 hp).

On the right bank, on Plesa mount, one can find the statue 'Energia', representing Prometheus with lightnings in his hand, symbolising electricity.

Situated between the mountains of and at the exit of the Ghitu massif, the lake is alimented by the rivers Capra, Buda and several direct tributaries (River Lady, and Valsan Cernatul, Valea lui Stan and clear), with a total average alimentation flow of 5.5 cubic metres per second (190 cu ft/s).

Vidraru 3D

At completion, it was 8th most elevated artificial lake in Europe, and the 20th in the world.

The construction of the Vidraru dam took five and a half years starting in 1960. For this achievement, it took 42 km of tunnel excavation through 1.768 million m3 of rock, of which about 1 million underground bands have 930,000 m3 of concrete of which 400,000 m3 underground and also were installed 6300 tonnes of electromechanical equipment.

On Lake Vidraru, people can practice the extreme sport of bungee jumping. Only a few hundred metres of the dam tourists can go to the House Argeseana “and the pier where the practice of leisure boat racing.

The only road to access the lake Vidraru is the spectacular Transfagarasan (DN7C), running from Curtea de Arges to Cartisoara, and passing in front of the hydro power plant, on the Vidraru dam, and around Vidraru Lake.

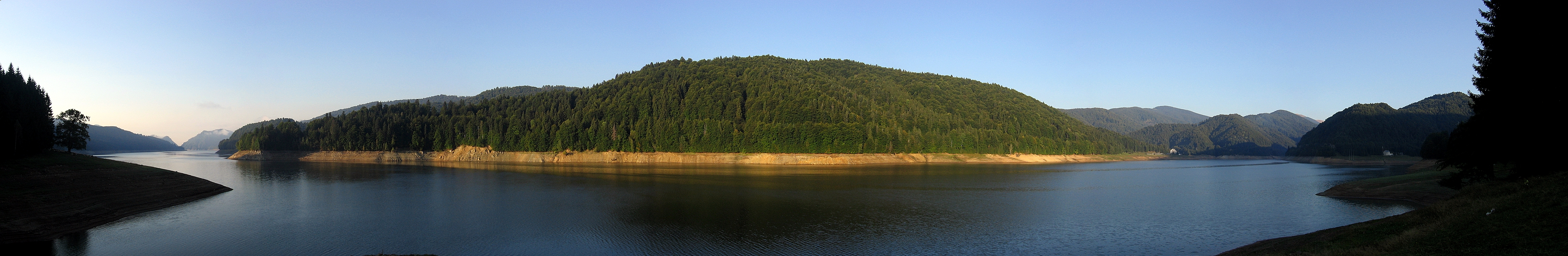
Lake Vidraru

== See also ==
- Lakes of Romania
