= Albeștii de Argeș =

- Commune
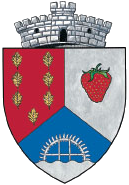
- Coat of arms

- Location in Romania
- Coordinates: 45°13′N 24°40′E
- Country: Romania
- County: Argeș

Government
  - Mayor (2020–2024): Gabriel Popa (PNL)
- Area: 43.43 km^{2} (16.77 sq mi)
- Elevation: 500 m (1,600 ft)
- Population (2021-12-01): 5,558
  - Density: 130/km^{2} (330/sq mi)
- Time zone: EET/EEST (UTC+2/+3)
- Postal code: 117010
- Area code: +(40) 248
- Vehicle reg.: AG
- Website: www.albestiidearges.ro

Albeștii de Argeș is a commune in Argeș County, Muntenia, Romania. It is composed of seven villages: Albeștii Pământeni (the commune centre), Albeștii Ungureni, Brătești, Doblea, Dobrotu, Dumirești, and Florieni.

Historical population
Year	Pop.	±%
2002	5,896	—
2011	5,456	−7.5%
2021	5,558	+1.9%
Source: Census data
