= Cicănești =

- Commune
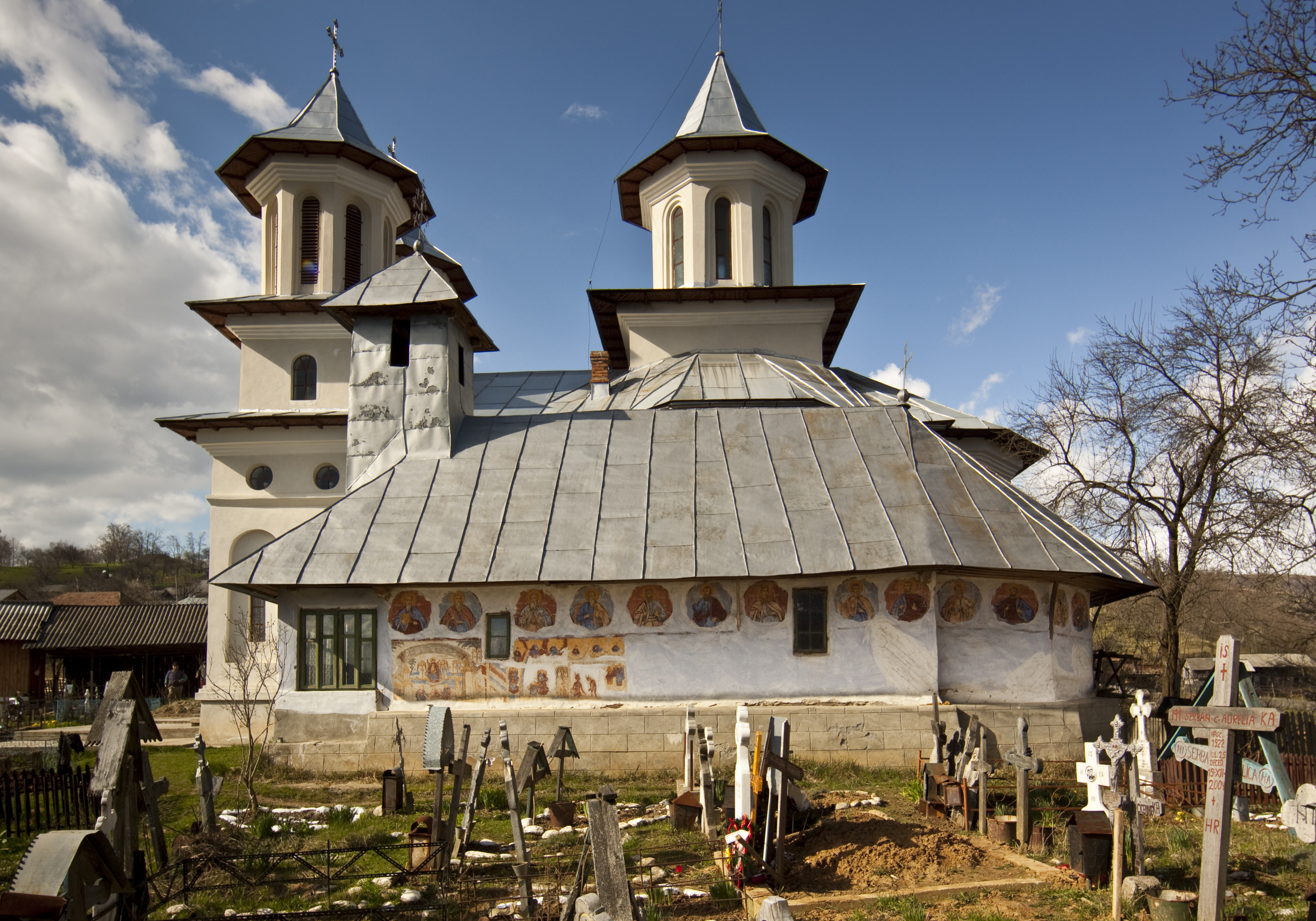
- Church in Urechești

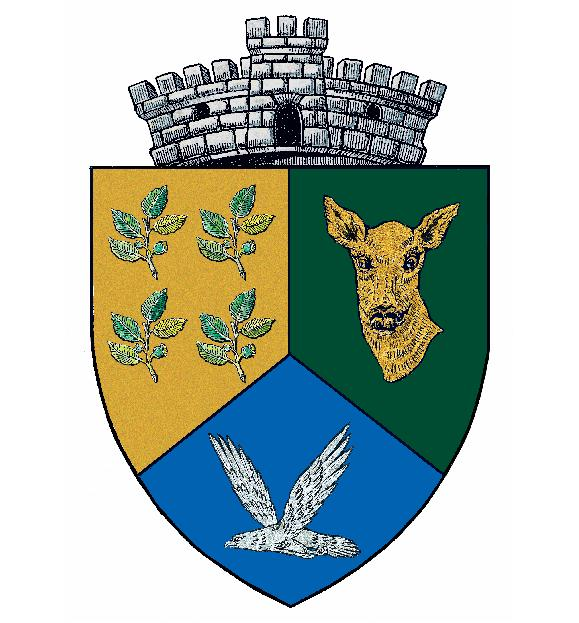
- Coat of arms

- Location in Romania
- Coordinates: 45°15′N 24°38′E
- Country: Romania
- County: Argeș

Government
  - Mayor (2024–2028): Ion Ionescu (PNL)
- Area: 29 km^{2} (11 sq mi)
- Elevation: 575 m (1,886 ft)
- Population (2021-12-01): 1,930
  - Density: 67/km^{2} (170/sq mi)
- Time zone: UTC+02:00 (EET)
  - Summer (DST): UTC+03:00 (EEST)
- Postal code: 117245
- Vehicle reg.: AG
- Website: www.cjarges.ro/en/web/cicanesti

Cicănești is a commune in Argeș County, Muntenia, Romania. It is composed of four villages: Bărăști, Cicănești, Mioarele, and Urechești.

== Natives ==
- Gheorghe Păun (born 1950), computer scientist
