= Curtea de Argeș =

- Municipality
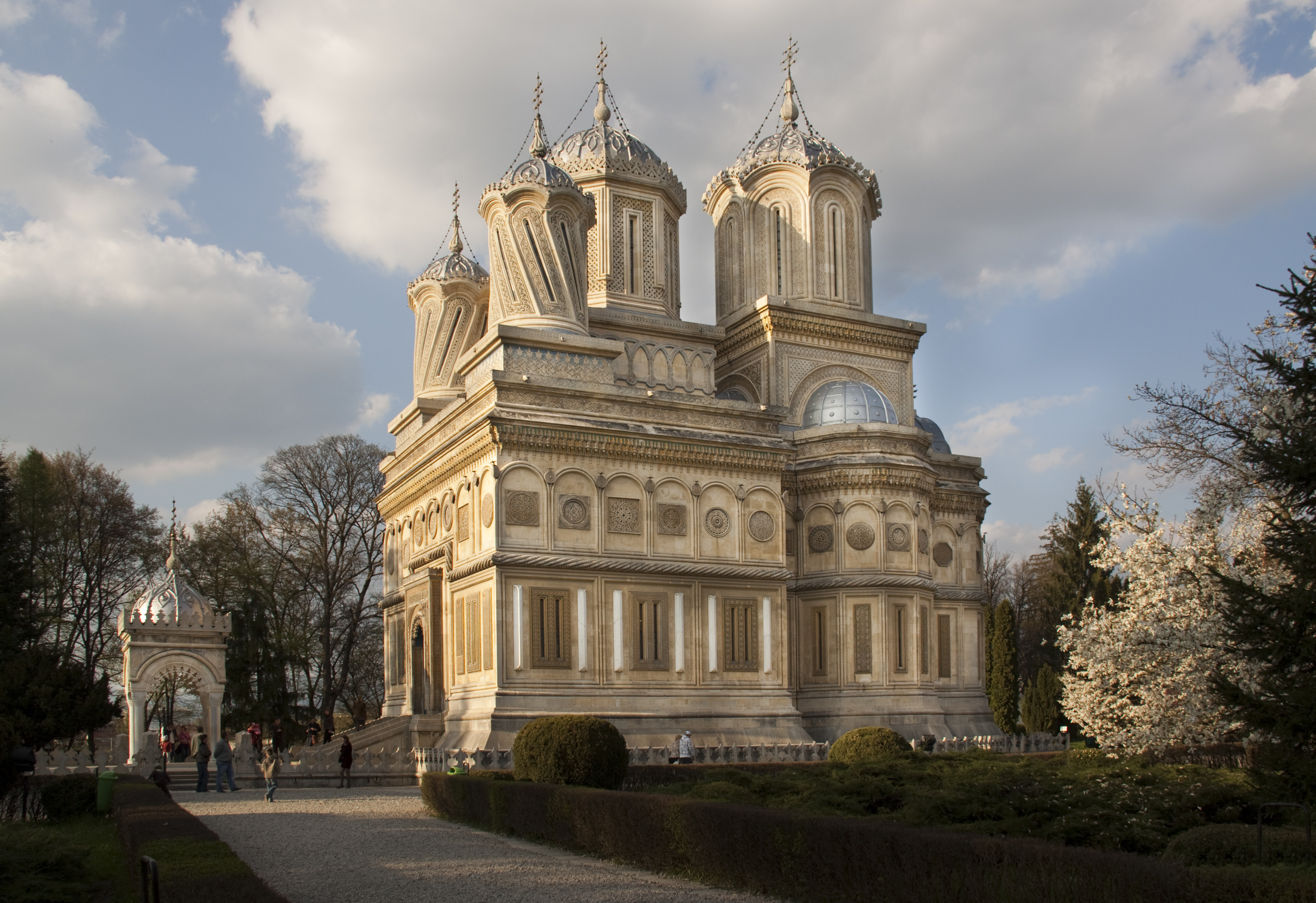
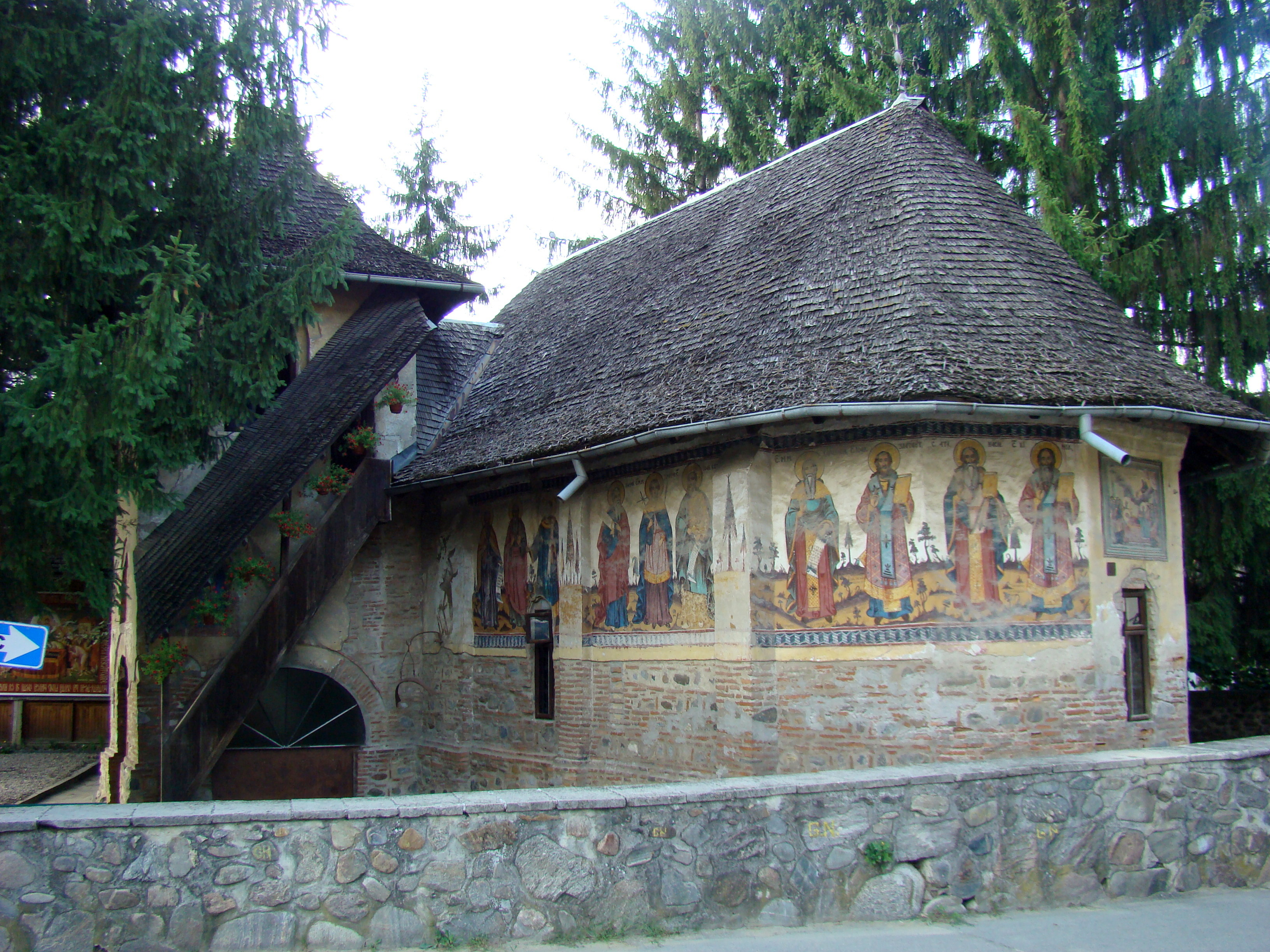
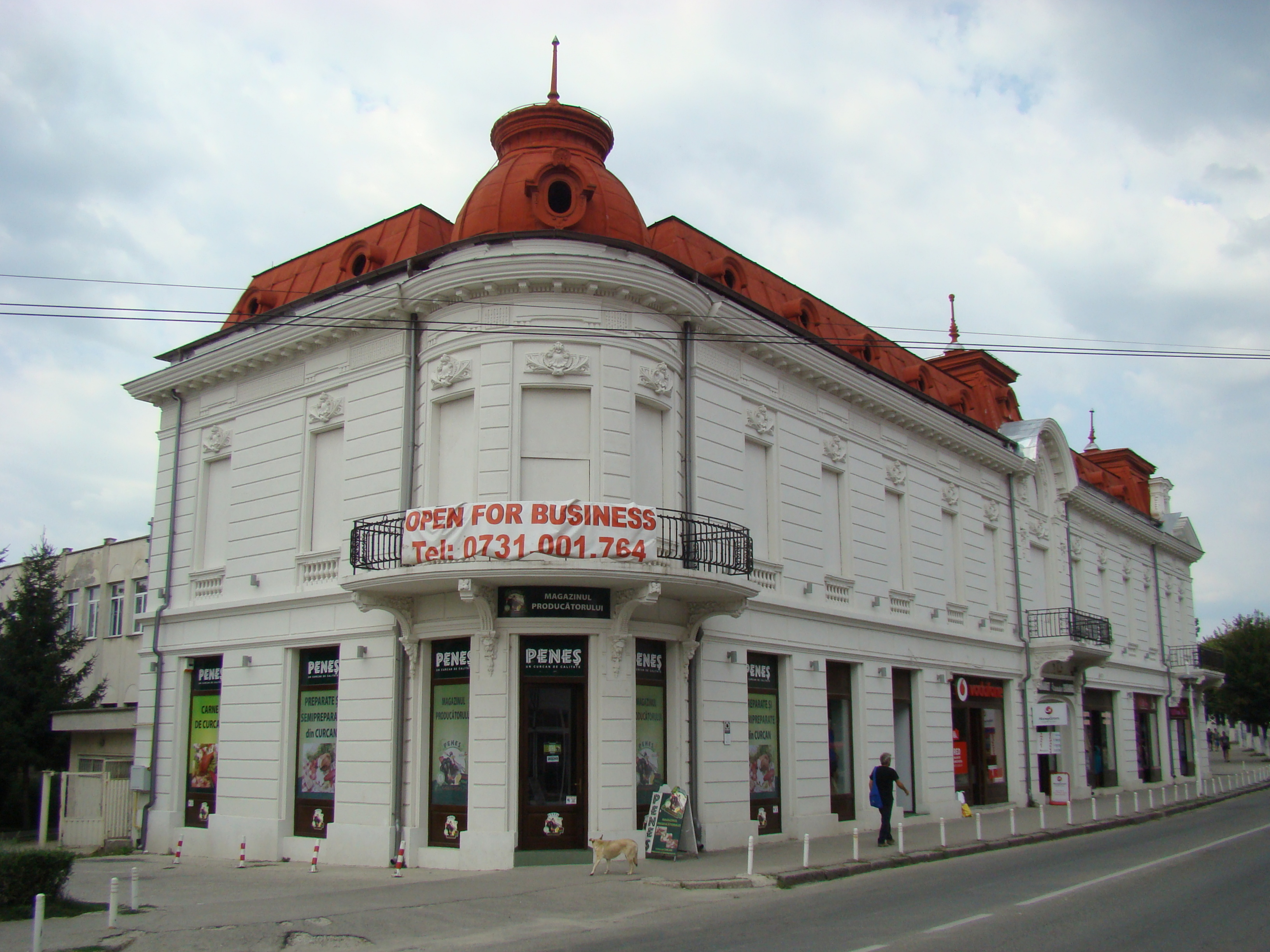
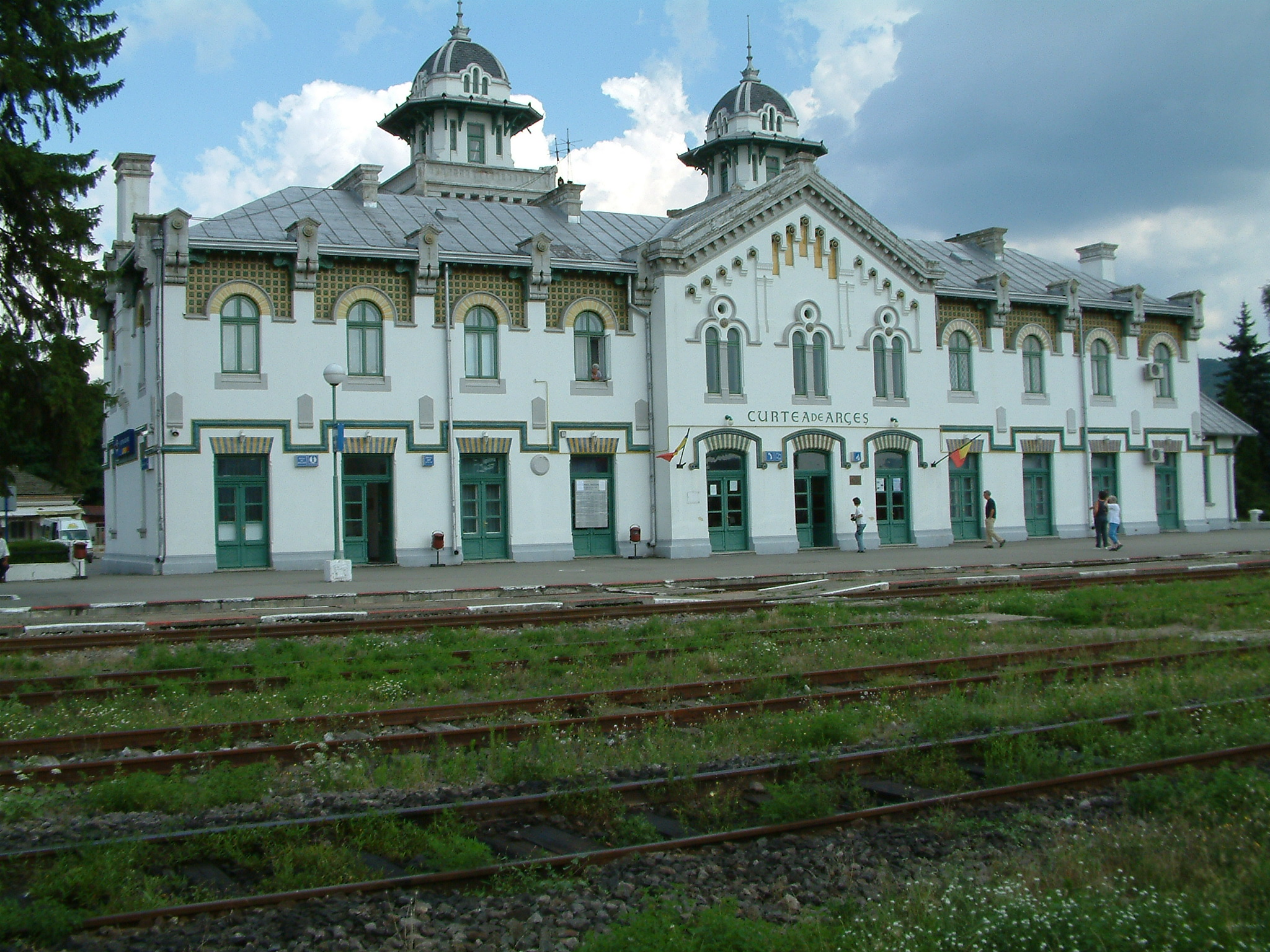
- Curtea de Argeș Cathedral "Olari" Dormition of the Theotokos Church The former Royal Hotel Train station

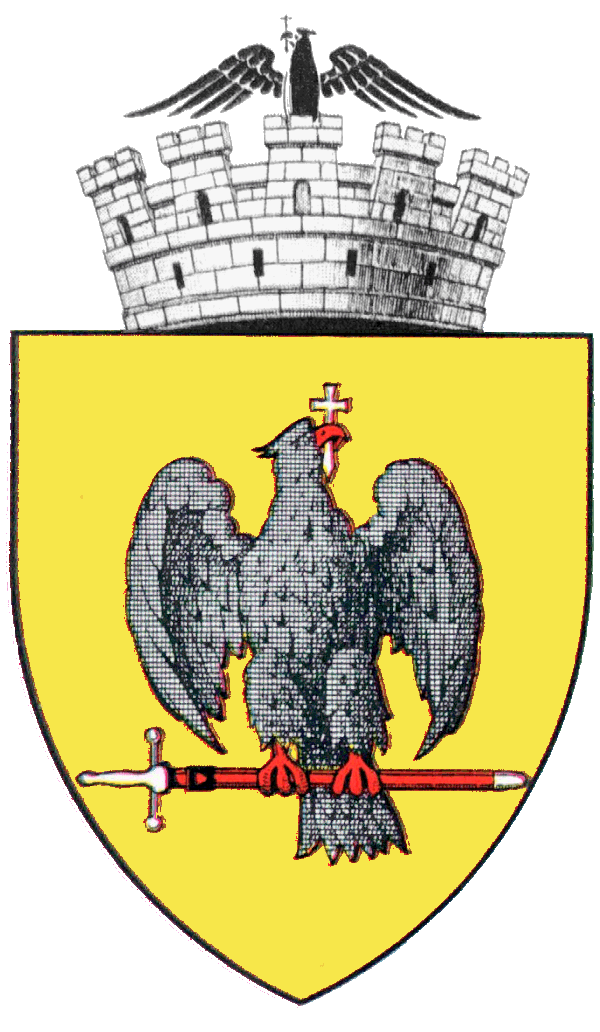
- Coat of arms

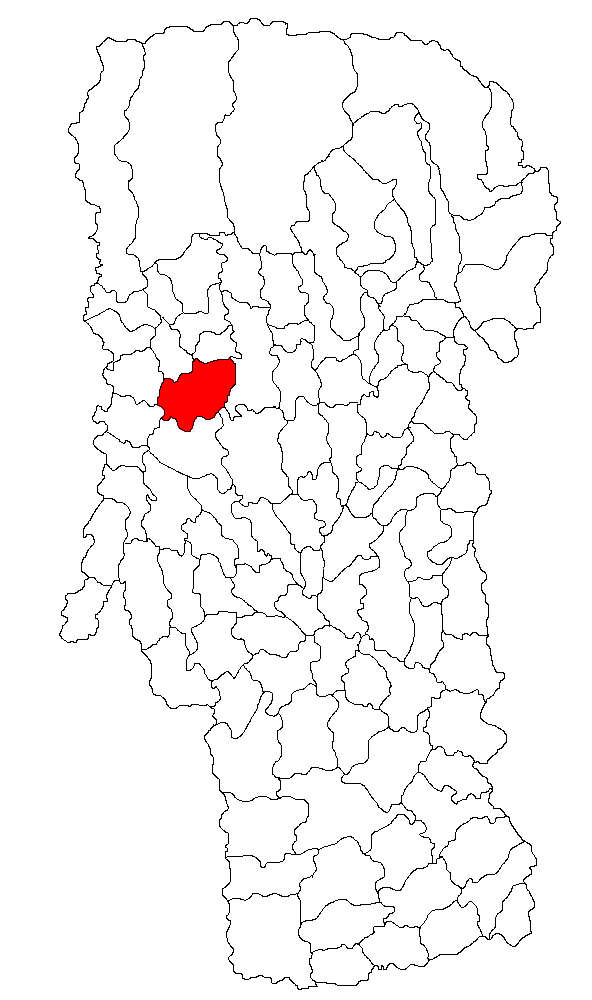
- Location in Argeș County

- Location in Romania
- Coordinates: 45°08′21″N 24°40′45″E
- Country: Romania
- County: Argeș

Government
  - Mayor (2024–2028): Constantin Panțurescu (PSD)
- Area: 75 km^{2} (29 sq mi)
- Elevation: 450 m (1,480 ft)
- Population (2021-12-01): 25,977
  - Density: 350/km^{2} (900/sq mi)
- Time zone: UTC+02:00 (EET)
  - Summer (DST): UTC+03:00 (EEST)
- Postal code: 115300
- Area code: (+40) 02 48
- Vehicle reg.: AG
- Website: www.primariacurteadearges.ro

Curtea de Argeș (Romanian pronunciation: [ˈkurte̯a de ˈardʒeʃ]) is a city in Romania on the left bank of the river Argeș, where it flows through a valley of the Southern Carpathians (the Făgăraș Mountains), on the railway from Pitești to the Turnu Roșu Pass. It is part of Argeș County. The city also administers one village, Noapteș.

On 7 July 1947 the total rainfall in Curtea de Argeș was 205.7 mm (8.10 in) in 20 minutes, which is a world record.

== Etymology and names ==
The present name, literally The Court upon (river) Argeș, refers to the former status of the town as the capital of Wallachia. Some historians identify the Argeș River with ancient "Ordessos", however the name is unlikely to be derived from this name. The oldest Slavonic documents use an "Arghiș" form, which might suggest a Cuman or Pecheneg etymology, from the root arghiš ("higher ground", "heights").

The original name was Argeș, which was then used for the name of the river as well.

== History ==
Historical population
Year	Pop.	±%
1900	4,210	—
1912	6,279	+49.1%
1930	6,809	+8.4%
1948	9,180	+34.8%
1956	10,764	+17.3%
1966	16,423	+52.6%
1977	24,645	+50.1%
1992	35,824	+45.4%
2002	32,626	−8.9%
2011	27,359	−16.1%
2021	25,977	−5.1%
Source: Census data

=== Capital of Wallachia ===
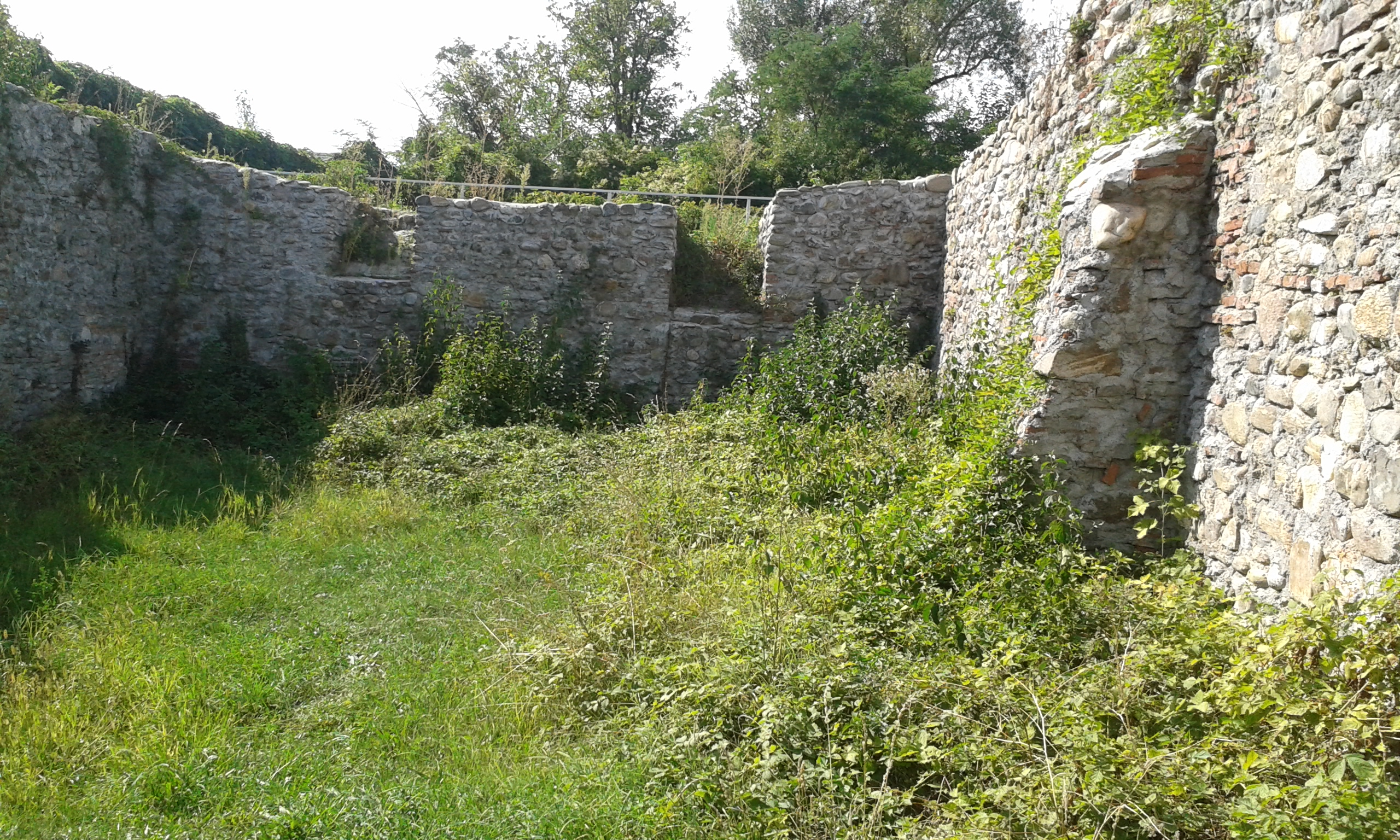
Ruins of the medieval princely court in Curtea de Argeș

One of the oldest towns in Wallachia, Curtea de Argeș was the capital of a small local state which was the start for the unification of the lands south of the Carpathians. The oldest archeological evidence of it being the seat of such a ruler dates from the 13th century.

Câmpulung was the seat of Basarab I, the voivode of Wallachia, who was first mentioned in a document written in 1324 at the court of Charles I of Hungary. The next year, a conflict broke out between the two and in 1330, Charles I organized an expedition against the "unfaithful" Basarab and destroyed the Argeș stronghold.

The tradition of Wallachian chronicles differs from the Hungarian documents: they don't mention Basarab I and instead, they claim that Argeș was founded in 1290 by Radu Negru who crossed the Carpathians from Transylvania to found the cities of Curtea de Argeș and Câmpulung.

While Câmpulung is sometimes credited as the first capital of Wallachia, the Wallachian chronicles mention only Curtea de Argeș as being the capital, this being supported by the fact that the Hungarian documents mention that Charles I attacked the Argeș stronghold and not the Câmpulung one.

After 1340, a new royal court was built at Argeș, containing a palace and a church, the whole compound having an area of 0.76 hectares (1.9 acres). It was here that the Metropolitan Orthodox Church of Wallachia was founded in 1359.

The town traded with Transylvania, focusing on the town of Sibiu, to which it had a direct road crossing the Olt Valley and Țara Loviștei. The commercial area of the town was around the court and the St. Nicholas in Târg Church, where the bazar was located.

=== Decline ===
This Argeș court was the residence of the Wallachian hospodars until Mircea I of Wallachia, included. The following rulers used both Argeș and Târgoviște as the seats of the court and traveler Johann Schiltberger mentioned that in 1396 both cities were capitals.

From 1396 to 1460, Wallachia was tributary to the Sunni-Islamic Ottoman Empire, the hospodars being vassals of its Great Sultan.

During the 15th century, their court was used alternately with the one in Târgoviște, but in the 16th century, the capital was completely moved to Târgoviște and the Argeș court was rarely visited.

Argeș was one of the most important towns in Wallachia in the 14th and 15th centuries, but starting with the 16th century, its importance began to fade. The Orthodox Metropolitan's seat was moved to Târgoviște in 1517, while the Catholic bishopric ended its activity in 1519. A fall in the trade with Sibiu and Brașov also led to a population decline.

After the Curtea de Argeș Monastery was built during the rule of Neagoe Basarab, the rulers of Wallachia favored it and, apart from donations (part of the town's domain), they gave it rights over the town. The monastery presided over trials in the marketplace and it was allowed to build a customs house and mills. This eroded the autonomy of the town and led to further economic slump.

=== Modern era ===
The united country's first modern king, Carol I of Romania renovated the Curtea de Argeș Monastery and designated it as a royal necropolis in 1886. Curtea de Argeș became the burial place for the Royal House of Romania (a branch of the Hohenzollern-Sigmaringen dynasty), including Carol I, Ferdinand I and Queen Marie, and Michael I and Queen Anne. King Carol I also built a railway linking Curtea de Argeș to Bucharest; the city's railway station, designed by architect André Lecomte du Noüy and constructed by engineer Elie Radu in 1898, stands out as one of the distinctive architectural masterpieces of the city.

The Ștefănescu-Goangă brothers, Mihail and Florian, contributed to modernizing the city's infrastructure during 1920s and 1930s. As a mayor, Mihail Ștefănesu Goangă oversaw the building of the city's first paved roads, post office, and central market. Florian Ștefănescu-Goangă founded the summer school of the Babeș-Bolyai University in Curtea de Argeș, which later became the Vlaicu Vodă National College, one of the most prestigious high schools in Romania.

During the Communist regime, state-led industrialization led to the construction of several major factories in the city, which became a major producer of agricultural proteins, porcelain, and textiles. During the 1990s, most of the communist-era industries closed down, but Curtea de Argeș remains a manufacturing center for textiles and high-end fashion.

== Ecclesiastical History ==
=== Latin Bishopric of Argeș ===
In the first decades of the 14th century, a group of German Catholics from Saxony were brought under the authority of the Catholic bishop of (Hungarian) Transylvania and they were settled in the city. In 1381, the Latin Diocese of Argeș was founded as then-only Catholic bishopric in Wallachia, suffragan of the Hungarian Metropolitan Archdiocese of Kalocsa. No incumbent names are available.

It was suppressed in 1519/20 (just after the Orthodox Metropolis), its territory being used in 1590 to establish the Diocese of Bacău.

In the 17th century the bishopric moved to Bacău due to the decrease in the number of local Catholics.

=== Orthodox Archbishopric of Argeș ===
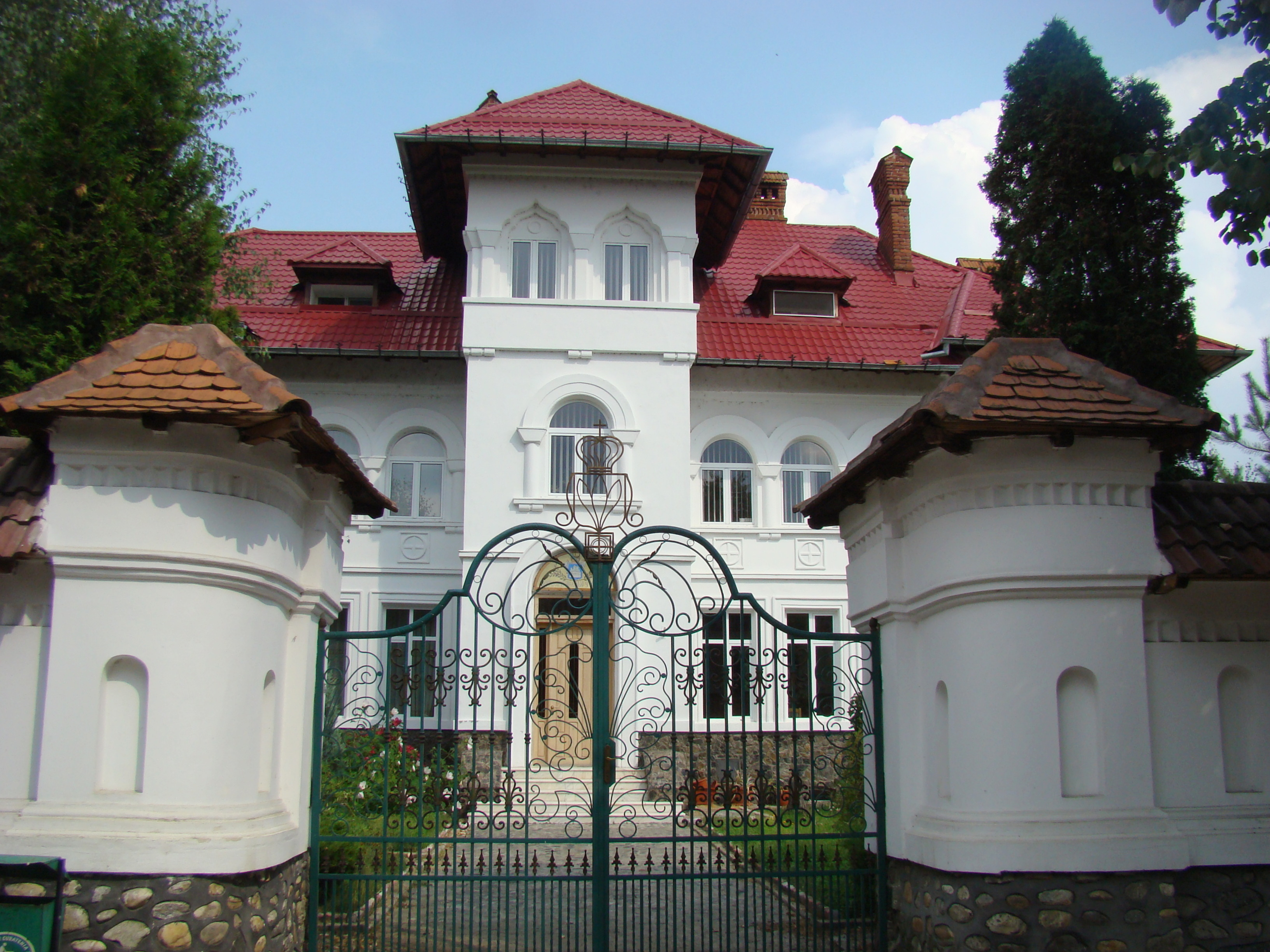
Episcopal Palace

A Greek Orthodox archbishopric of Argeș was established in 1396, under authority of the Ecumenical Patriarch of Constantinople by Callistus I, but disputed by the Bulgarian Patriarchate of Ochrid.

The Orthodox Metropolitan's seat was moved to Târgoviște in 1517, just before the Catholic bishopric ended its activity.

However, at the close of the 18th century, it again became the seat of the modern Romanian Orthodox Archdiocese of Argeș and Muscel, under the Metropolis of Wallachia and Dobrudja.

=== Landmark churches ===
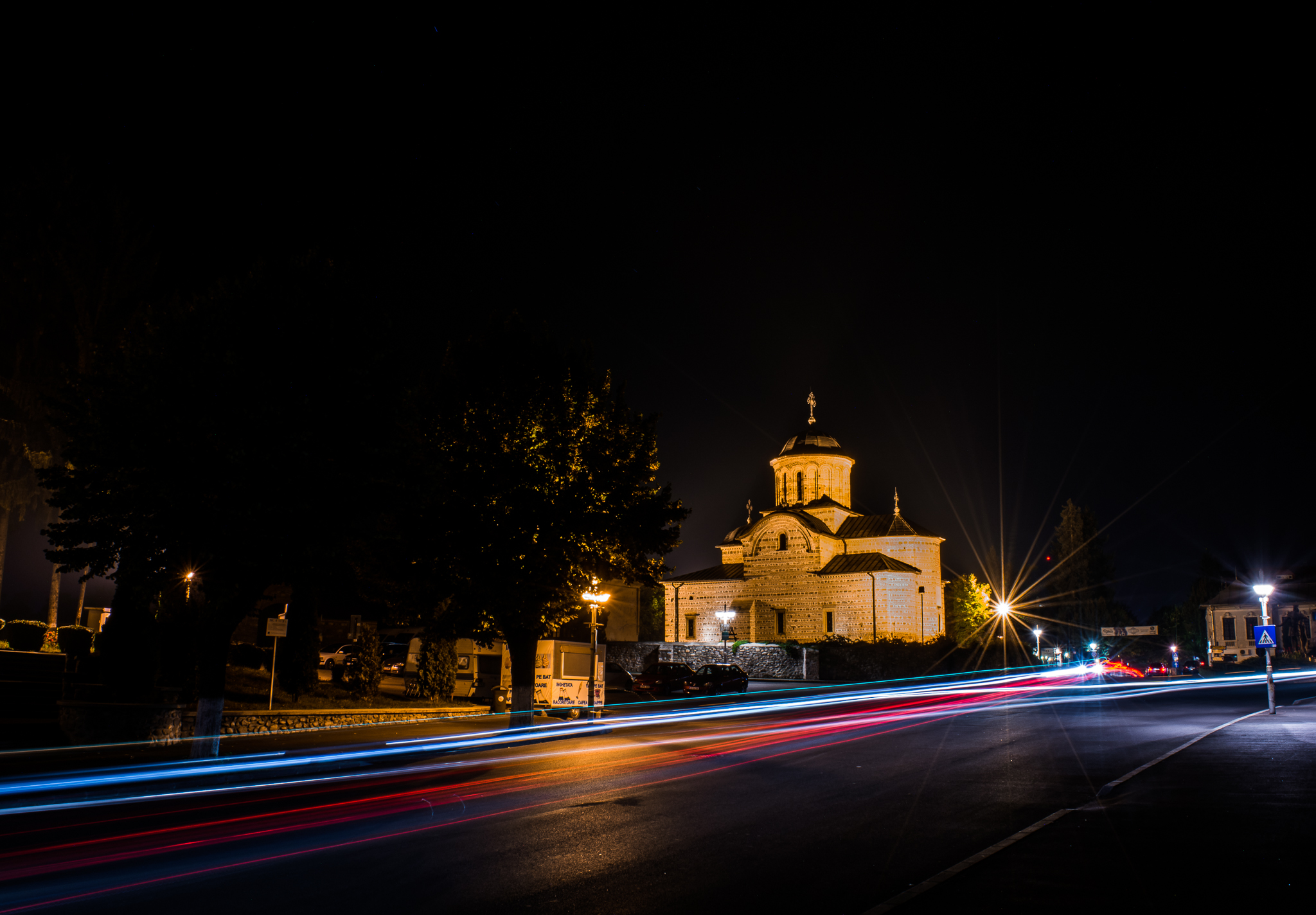
St. Nicholas Princely Church

The city is the site of several medieval churches (among them the Curtea de Argeș Cathedral) having been an Orthodox bishopric again since the close of the 18th century.

The most important church is the Princely Church of Saint Nicholas built by Basarab I, completely renovated in 2003–2004. It resembles a stone fortress, connected through catacombs to a guard tower on a nearby hill. Ruins of the Prince's Palace Complex are still visible. It is mentioned in Alexandru Odobescu's Doamna Chiajna. One of the most enduring and famous Romanian legends, the legend of Meșterul Manole, is related to the monastery's construction.

== Natives ==
- Mattei Dogan (1920–2010), political sociologist and academic
- Nicolae Pleșiță (1929–2009), head of the Securitate Foreign Intelligence Service
- Florian Ștefănescu-Goangă (1881–1958), psychologist, founder of the Romanian Institute of Experimental Psychology, and president of Babeș-Bolyai University
- Bogdan Suceavă (born 1969), mathematician and writer
- Urmuz (1883–1923), avant-garde short-story writer

== Gallery ==
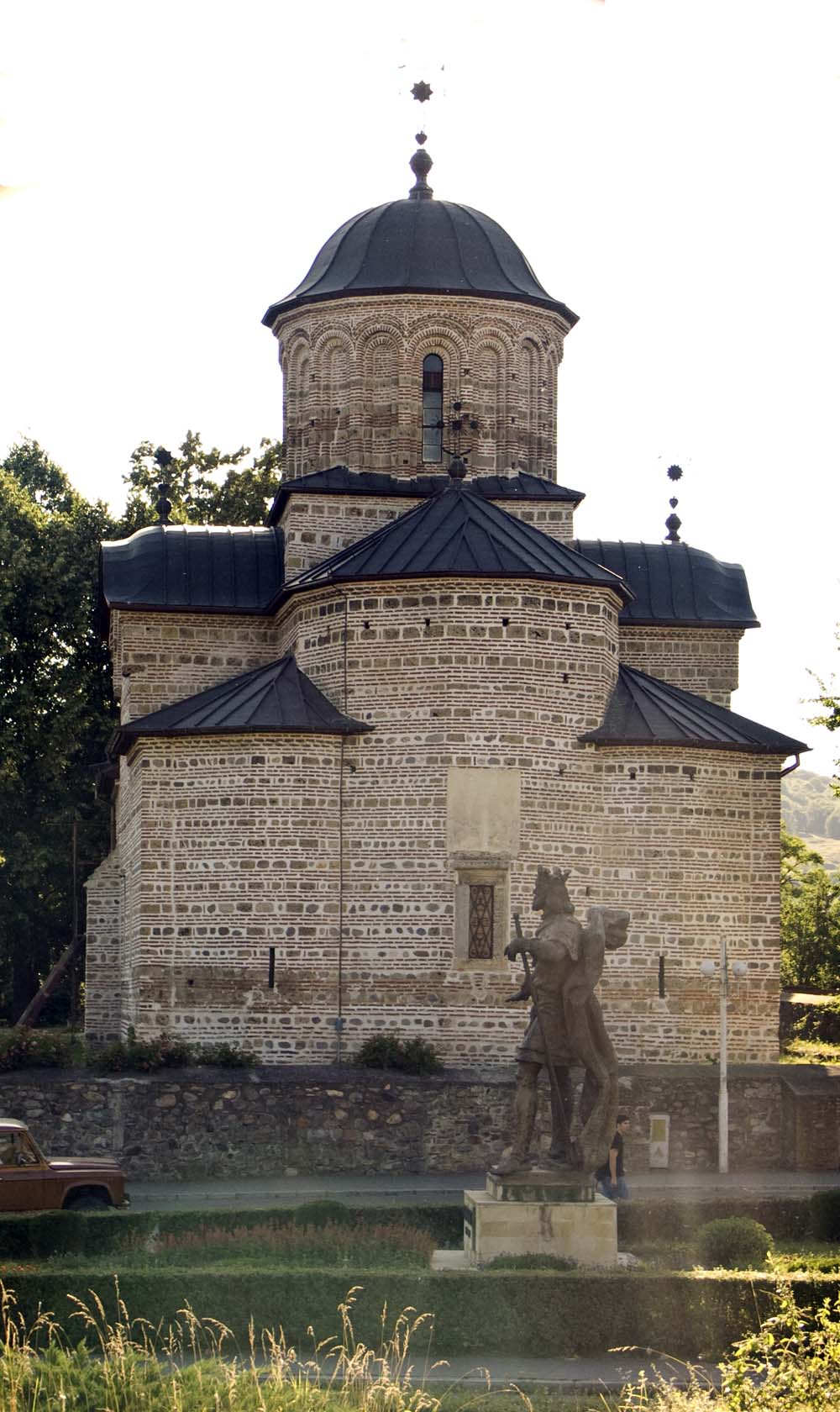
St. Nicholas Princely Church

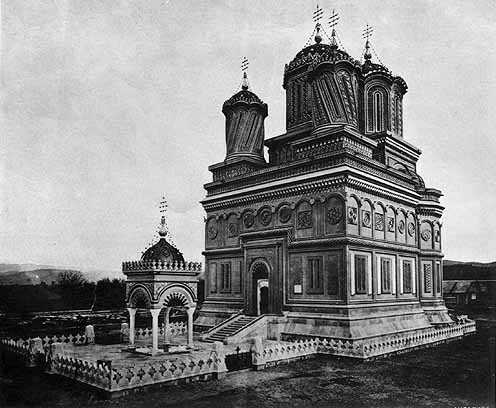
Curtea de Argeș Cathedral in an 1880 engraving

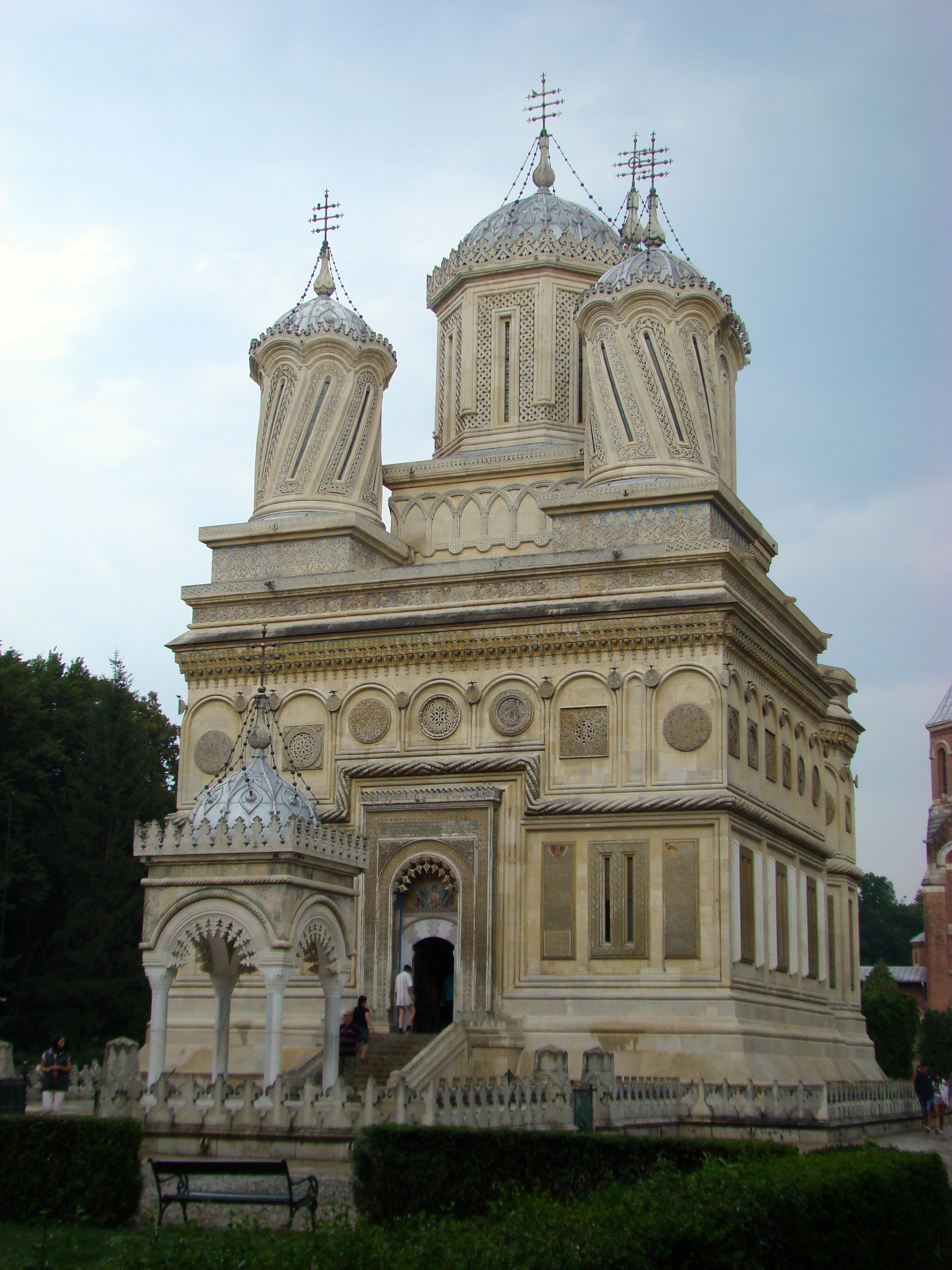
Cathedral

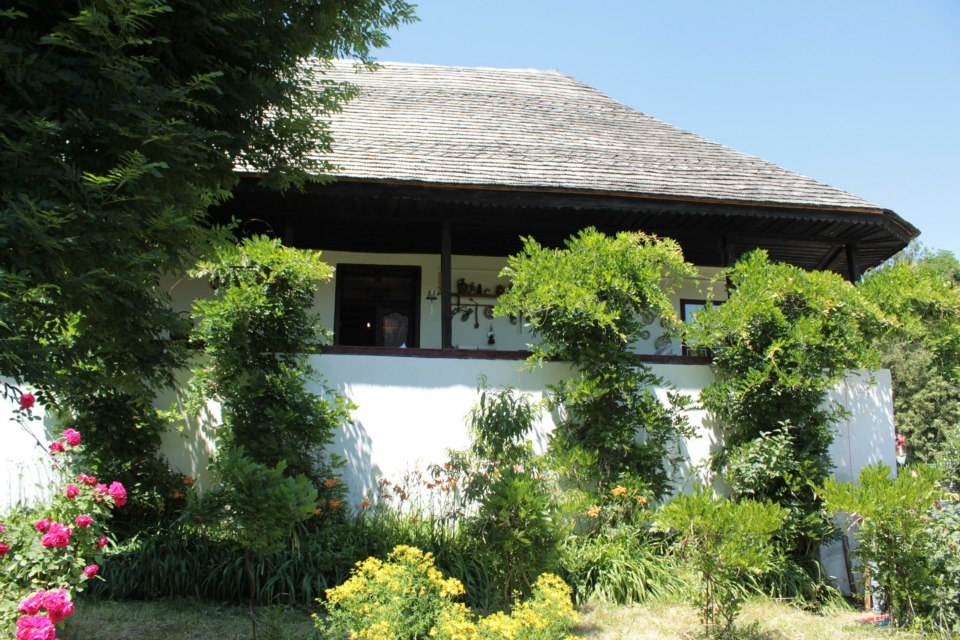
Goangă House

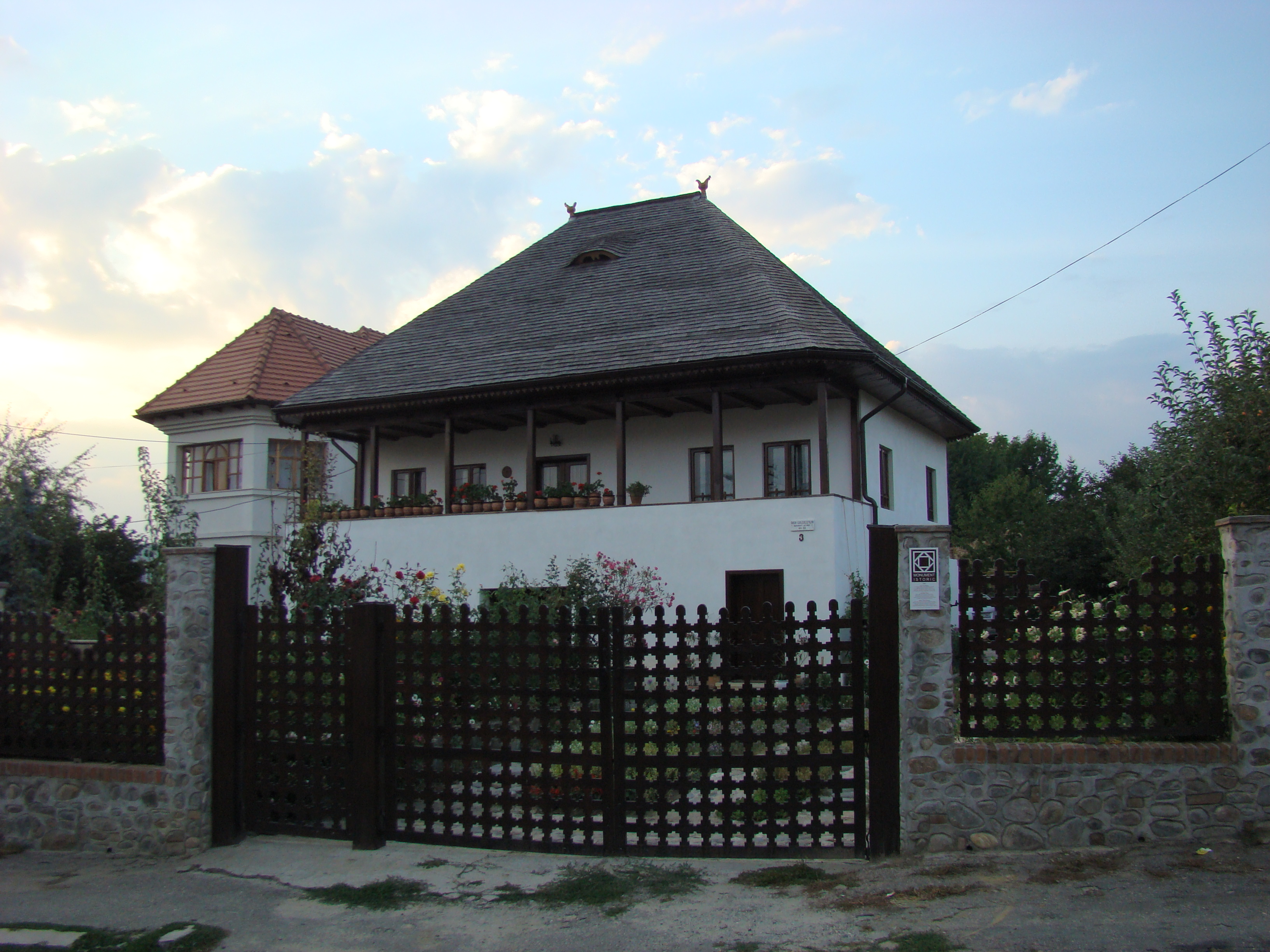
Cioculeștilor House

== See also ==
- Wallachia
- Basarab I of Wallachia
- Curtea de Argeș Cathedral
