= Aninoasa (disambiguation) =

Aninoasa is a town in Hunedoara County, Romania.

Aninoasa also may refer to the following Romanian places:

- Aninoasa, Argeș, commune
- Aninoasa, Dâmbovița, commune
- Aninoasa, Gorj, commune
- Aninoasa, a village in Reci Commune, Covasna County
- Aninoasa, a village in Glăvile Commune, Vâlcea County
- Aninoasa, a tributary of the Călinești in Vâlcea County
- Aninoasa (Dâmbovița), a tributary of the Dâmbovița in Dâmbovița County
- Aninoasa, a tributary of the Jiul de Vest in Hunedoara County
- Aninoasa (Olt), a tributary of the Olt in Vâlcea County
- Aninoasa, a tributary of the Olteț in Vâlcea County
