= Valea Hotarului River =

Valea Hotarului River may refer to:

- Valea Hotarului, a tributary of the Valea Bădenilor in Argeș County, Romania
- Valea Hotarului, a tributary of the Dâmbovița in Argeș County, Romania
