= Valea Largă (Dâmbovița) =

- Valea Largă near Pucheni

- Location within Romania

Location
- Country: Romania
- Counties: Dâmbovița County
- Villages: Pucheni, Valea Largă, Micloșanii Mari

Physical characteristics
- Source: Leaota Mountains
- Mouth: Dâmbovița
  - location: Capu Coastei
  - coordinates: 45.1486°N 25.2206°E
- Length: 14 km (8.7 mi)
- Basin size: 32 km^{2} (12 sq mi)

Basin features
- Progression: Dâmbovița→ Argeș→ Danube→ Black Sea

The Valea Largă is a left tributary of the river Dâmbovița in Romania. It flows into the Dâmbovița in Capu Coastei. Its length is 14 km (8.7 mi) and its basin size is 32 km^{2} (12 sq mi).
