= Valea Gruiului River =

Valea Gruiului River may refer to:

- Valea Gruiului, a tributary of the Dâmbovița in Argeș County, Romania
- Valea Gruiului, a tributary of the Valea Bădenilor in Argeș County, Romania
