= Cetățeni =

- Commune
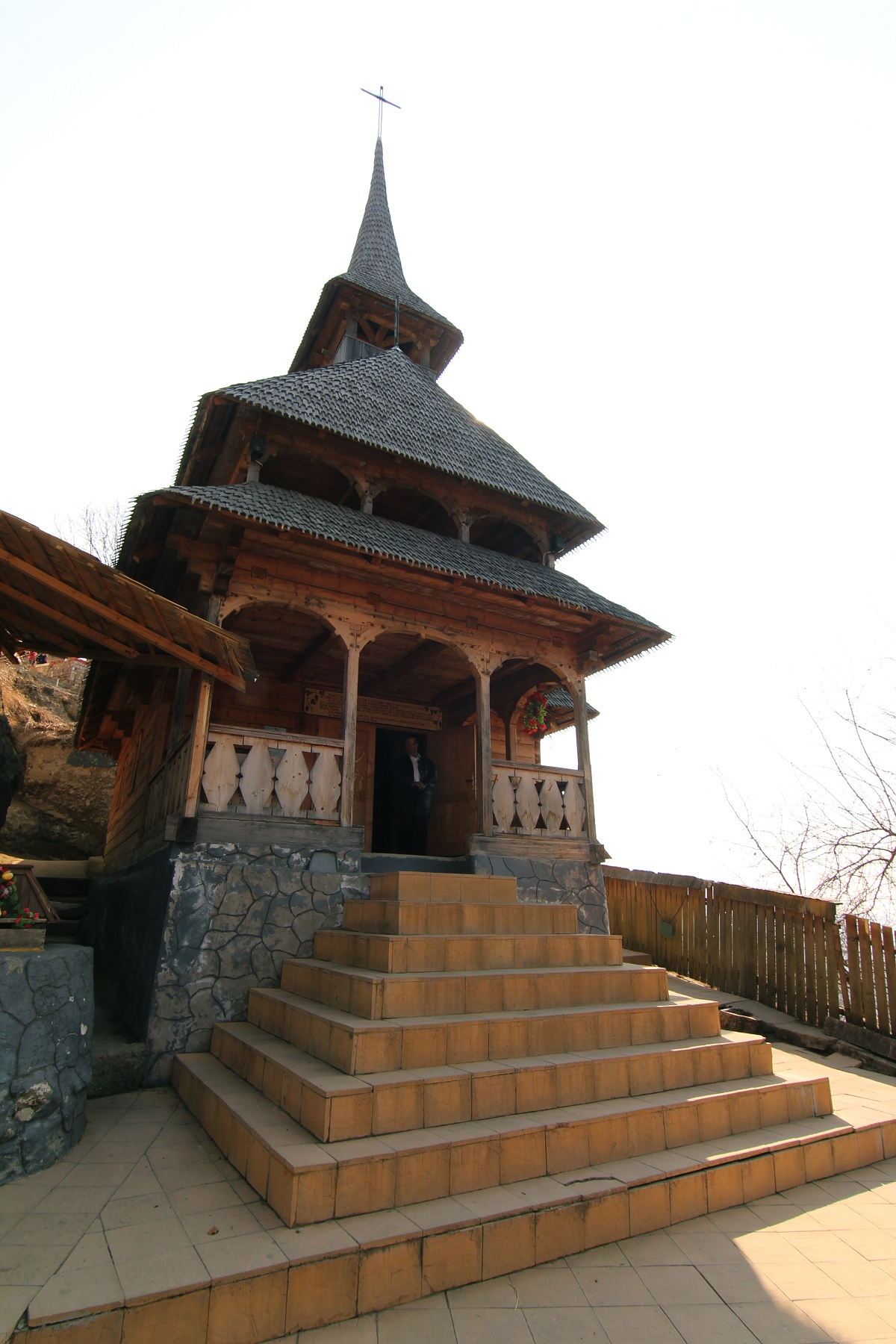
- Church at Negru Vodă Hermitage

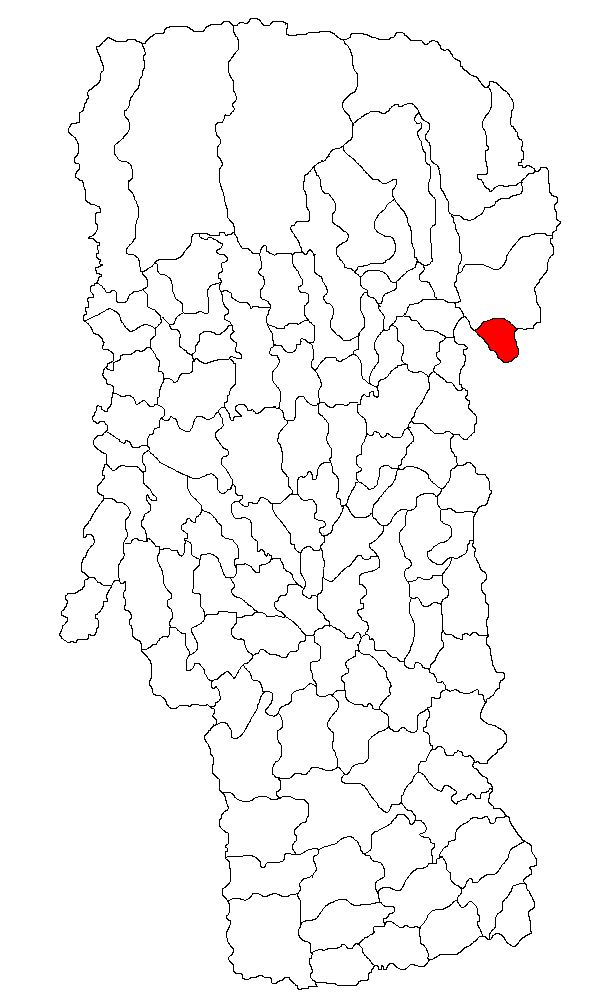
- Location in Argeș County

- Location in Romania
- Coordinates: 45°12′N 25°11′E
- Country: Romania
- County: Argeș

Government
  - Mayor (2020–2024): Ion-Mugurel Minciună (PSD)
- Area: 34 km^{2} (13 sq mi)
- Elevation: 496 m (1,627 ft)
- Population (2021-12-01): 2,732
  - Density: 80/km^{2} (210/sq mi)
- Time zone: UTC+02:00 (EET)
  - Summer (DST): UTC+03:00 (EEST)
- Postal code: 117240
- Vehicle reg.: AG
- Website: www.primariecetateni.ro

Cetățeni is a commune in Argeș County, Muntenia, Romania. It is composed of three villages: Cetățeni, Lăicăi, and Valea Cetățuia.

The commune is situated at a distance of 91 km (57 mi) from Pitești and 25 km (16 mi) from Câmpulung, right next to Dâmbovița County. The neighboring communes are: Stoenești to the north, Pucheni to the east, Malu cu Flori to the south, Văleni to the west, and Mioarele to the northwest.

Cetățuia Monastery is located here.
