= Gârlița Satului =

- Location within Romania

Location
- Country: Romania
- Counties: Dâmbovița County
- Villages: Văcăreşti

Physical characteristics
- Mouth: Dâmbovița
  - coordinates: 44.765°N 25.553°E
- Length: 16 km (9.9 mi)
- Basin size: 27 km^{2} (10 sq mi)

Basin features
- Progression: Dâmbovița→ Argeș→ Danube→ Black Sea

The Gârlița Satului is a left tributary of the river Dâmbovița in Romania. It discharges into the Dâmbovița in Nucet. Its length is 16 km (9.9 mi) and its basin size is 27 km^{2} (10 sq mi).
