= Pițigaia =

Pițigaia may refer to several villages in Romania:

- Pițigaia, a village in Stâlpeni Commune, Argeș County
- Pițigaia, a village in Frumușani Commune, Călărași County

== See also ==
- Pițigoi, a village in Prahova Commune, Romania
