= Cândești =

Cândești may refer to several places in Romania:

- Cândești, Botoșani, a commune in Botoșani County
- Cândești, Dâmbovița, a commune in Dâmbovița County
- Cândești, Neamț, a commune in Neamț County
- Cândești, a village in Avram Iancu Commune, Alba County
- Cândești, a village in Albeștii de Muscel Commune, Argeș County
- Cândești, a village in Vernești Commune, Buzău County
- Cândești, a village in Dumbrăveni Commune, Vrancea County
