= Valea lui Coman =

Valea lui Coman Pârâul lui Coman
- Location within Romania

Location
- Country: Romania
- Counties: Argeș County

Physical characteristics
- Source: Leaota Mountains
- Mouth: Dâmbovița
  - location: Valea Cetățuia
  - coordinates: 45.2189°N 25.2026°E
- Length: 12 km (7.5 mi)
- Basin size: 22 km^{2} (8.5 sq mi)

Basin features
- Progression: Dâmbovița→ Argeș→ Danube→ Black Sea
- Tributaries
  - left: Valea Stânei, Valea Olanelor, Valea Piscul Curii
  - right: Valea Găinii

The Valea lui Coman (also: Pârâul lui Coman, in its upper course also: Valea Fiașului) is a left tributary of the river Dâmbovița in Romania. Its source is in the Leaota Mountains. It flows into the Dâmbovița in Valea Cetățuia. Its length is 12 km (7.5 mi) and its basin size is 22 km^{2} (8.5 sq mi).
