= Ilfov (river) =

- Location within Romania

Location
- Country: Romania
- Counties: Dâmbovița, Ilfov

Physical characteristics
- Mouth: Dâmbovița
  - coordinates: 44.4812°N 25.9136°E
- Length: 96 km (60 mi)
- Basin size: 203 km^{2} (78 sq mi)

Basin features
- Progression: Dâmbovița→ Argeș→ Danube→ Black Sea
- Tributaries
  - right: Mierea

The Ilfov is a left tributary of the river Dâmbovița in Romania. The river has given its name to Ilfov County. Its source is in the hills west of Târgoviște. It flows through the villages Udrești, Bungetu, Ilfoveni, Mircea Vodă, Heleșteu, Răcari and Bâldana. It discharges into the Dâmbovița near Bâcu. Its length is 96 km (60 mi) and its basin size is 203 km^{2} (78 sq mi).
