= Rătei River =

Rătei River may refer to:

- Izvorul Rătei, a tributary of the Ialomița in Dâmbovița County, Romania
- Rătei, a tributary of the Cascue (Dâmbovița basin) in Argeș County, Romania
