= Orăști =

Orăști may refer to several villages in Romania:

- Orăști, a village in Poșaga Commune, Alba County
- Orăști, a village in Frumușani Commune, Călărași County
