= Câlnău (Dâmbovița) =

- Location within Romania

Location
- Country: Romania
- Counties: Ilfov, Călărași
- Villages: Frumușani, Pasărea

Physical characteristics
- Mouth: Dâmbovița
  - coordinates: 44.2703°N 26.4305°E
- Length: 31 km (19 mi)
- Basin size: 169 km^{2} (65 sq mi)

Basin features
- Progression: Dâmbovița→ Argeș→ Danube→ Black Sea

The Câlnău is a right tributary of the river Dâmbovița in Romania. It discharges into the Dâmbovița in Vasilați. Its length is 31 km (19 mi) and its basin size is 169 km^{2} (65 sq mi).
