= Priboiu =

Priboiu may refer to several villages in Romania:

- Priboiu, a village in Brănești Commune, Dâmbovița County
- Priboiu, a village in Tătărani Commune, Dâmbovița County
- Priboiu, a village in Crevedia Mare Commune, Giurgiu County
