= Puturosu =

Puturosu may refer to the following places in Romania:

- Puturosu, a tributary of the Burla in Botoșani County
- Puturosu, a tributary of the Cascue in Argeș County
- Puturosu, a tributary of the Jijia in Iași County
- Puturosu, a tributary of the Toplița in Harghita County
- Puturosu, a mountain in the volcanic Ciomad massif, in Covasna County
