= Cazaci =

Cazaci may refer to several villages in Romania:

- Cazaci, a village in Nucet Commune, Dâmbovița County
- Cazaci, a village in Tarcău Commune, Neamț County
