= Aninoasa (Olt) =

- Location within Romania

Location
- Country: Romania
- Counties: Vâlcea County

Physical characteristics
- Mouth: Olt
  - location: Bârsești
  - coordinates: 45.0502°N 24.3402°E
- Length: 10 km (6.2 mi)
- Basin size: 13 km^{2} (5.0 sq mi)

Basin features
- Progression: Olt→ Danube→ Black Sea

The Aninoasa is a left tributary of the river Olt in Romania. It flows into the Olt near Bârsești, south of Râmnicu Vâlcea. Its length is 10 km (6.2 mi) and its basin size is 13 km^{2} (5.0 sq mi).
