= Valea Vladului =

- Location within Romania

Location
- Country: Romania
- Counties: Argeș

Physical characteristics
- Source: Mount Berevoiul Mare
  - location: Făgăraș Mountains
  - coordinates: 45°35′21″N 24°58′34″E
  - elevation: 2,140 m (7,020 ft)
- Mouth: Dâmbovița
  - coordinates: 45°31′45″N 24°59′02″E
  - elevation: 1,255 m (4,117 ft)
- Length: 8 km (5.0 mi)
- Basin size: 20 km^{2} (7.7 sq mi)

Basin features
- Progression: Dâmbovița→ Argeș→ Danube→ Black Sea
- Tributaries
  - right: Călțunu

The Valea Vladului is a left tributary of the river Dâmbovița in Romania. It discharges into the Dâmbovița in the Făgăraș Mountains. Its length is 8 km (5.0 mi) and its basin size is 20 km^{2} (7.7 sq mi).
