= Cândești, Dâmbovița =

Cândești
- Commune
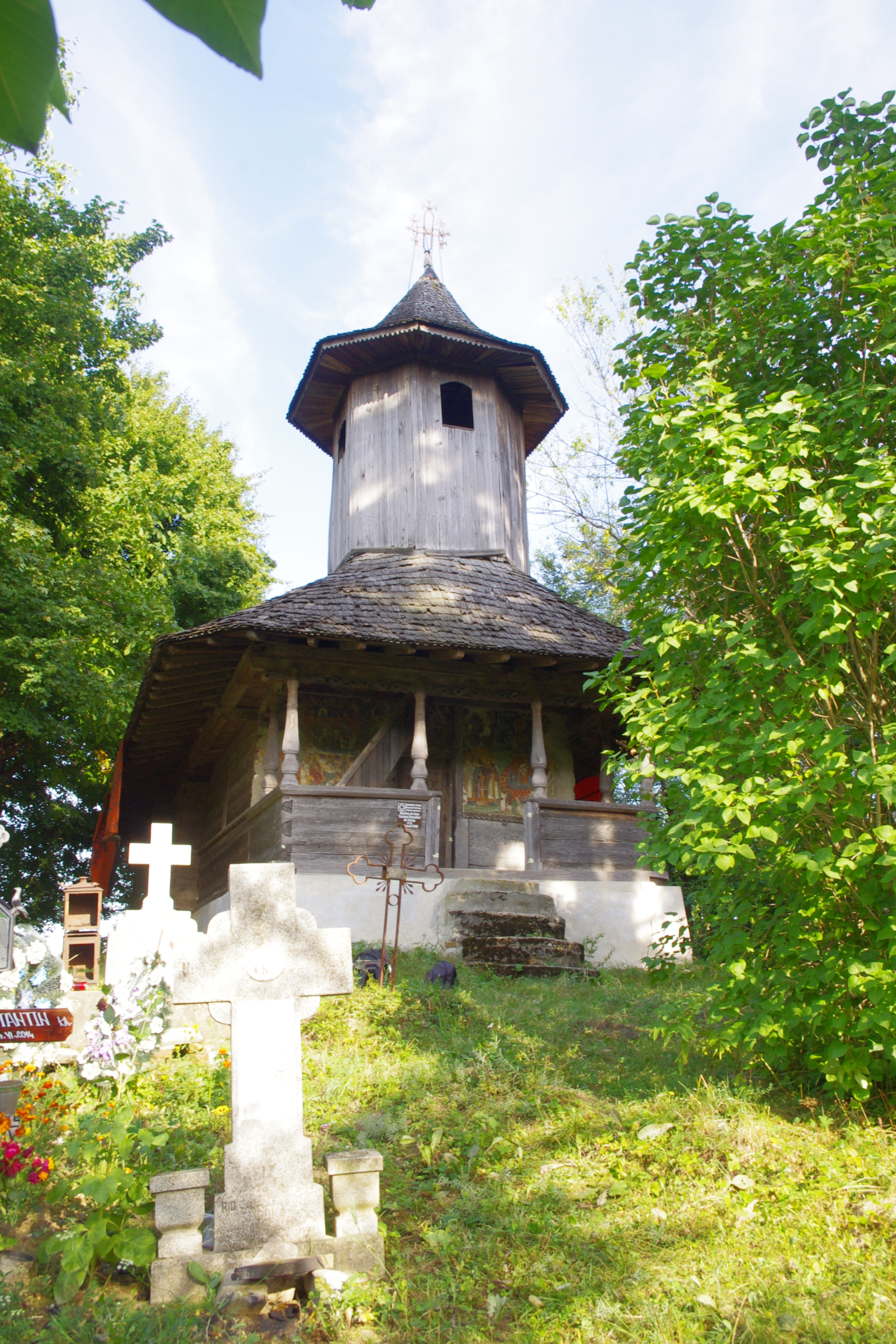
- Saint Parascheva Church, Cândești

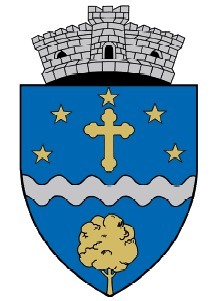
- Coat of arms

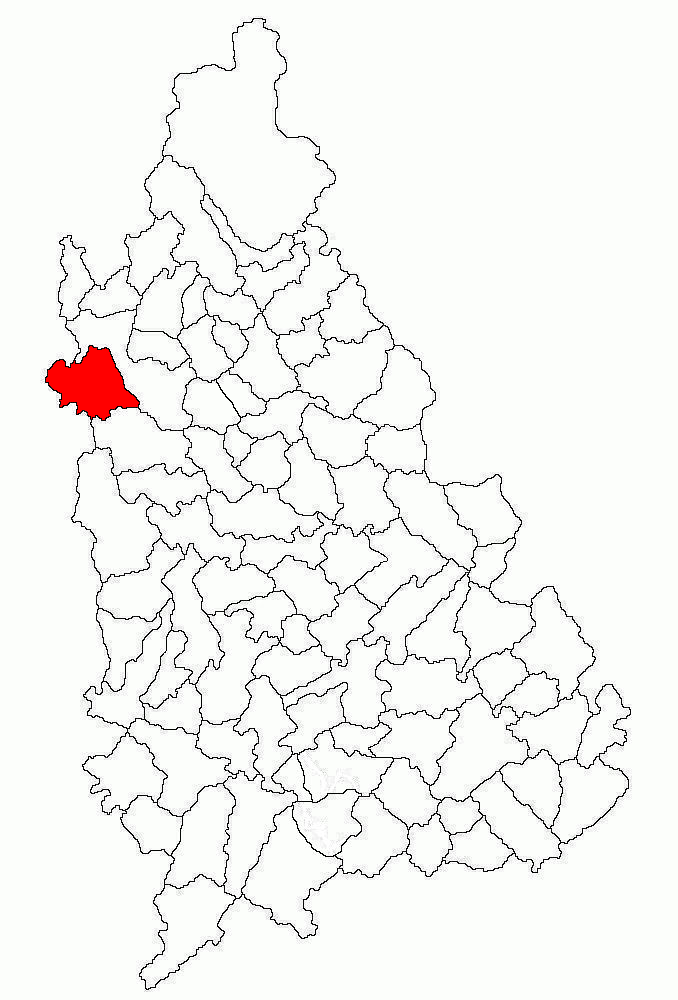
- Location in Dâmbovița County

- Location in Romania
- Coordinates: 45°5′N 25°13′E
- Country: Romania
- County: Dâmbovița

Government
  - Mayor (2024–2028): Alexandru Tudose (PNL)
- Area: 52.37 km^{2} (20.22 sq mi)
- Elevation: 455 m (1,493 ft)
- Population (2021-12-01): 2,579
  - Density: 49.25/km^{2} (127.5/sq mi)
- Time zone: UTC+02:00 (EET)
  - Summer (DST): UTC+03:00 (EEST)
- Postal code: 137083
- Area code: +(40) 245
- Vehicle reg.: DB
- Website: primariacandesti.ro

Cândești is a commune in Dâmbovița County, Muntenia, Romania. It is composed of five villages: Aninoșani, Cândești-Deal, Cândești-Vale (the commune center), Dragodănești, and Valea Mare.

The commune is located in the northwestern part of the county, 32 km (20 mi) away from the county seat, Târgoviște, on the border with Argeș County. It lies on the right bank of the Dâmbovița River. Its neighbors are Voinești commune to the north and to the east, Tătărani commune to the south, and Boțești, Argeș commune to the west.

Historical population
Year	Pop.	±%
2002	3,148	—
2011	2,886	−8.3%
2021	2,579	−10.6%
Source: Census data
