= Bucureștioara River =

River in Romania

Coordinates: 44°26′36.92″N 26°6′14.49″E

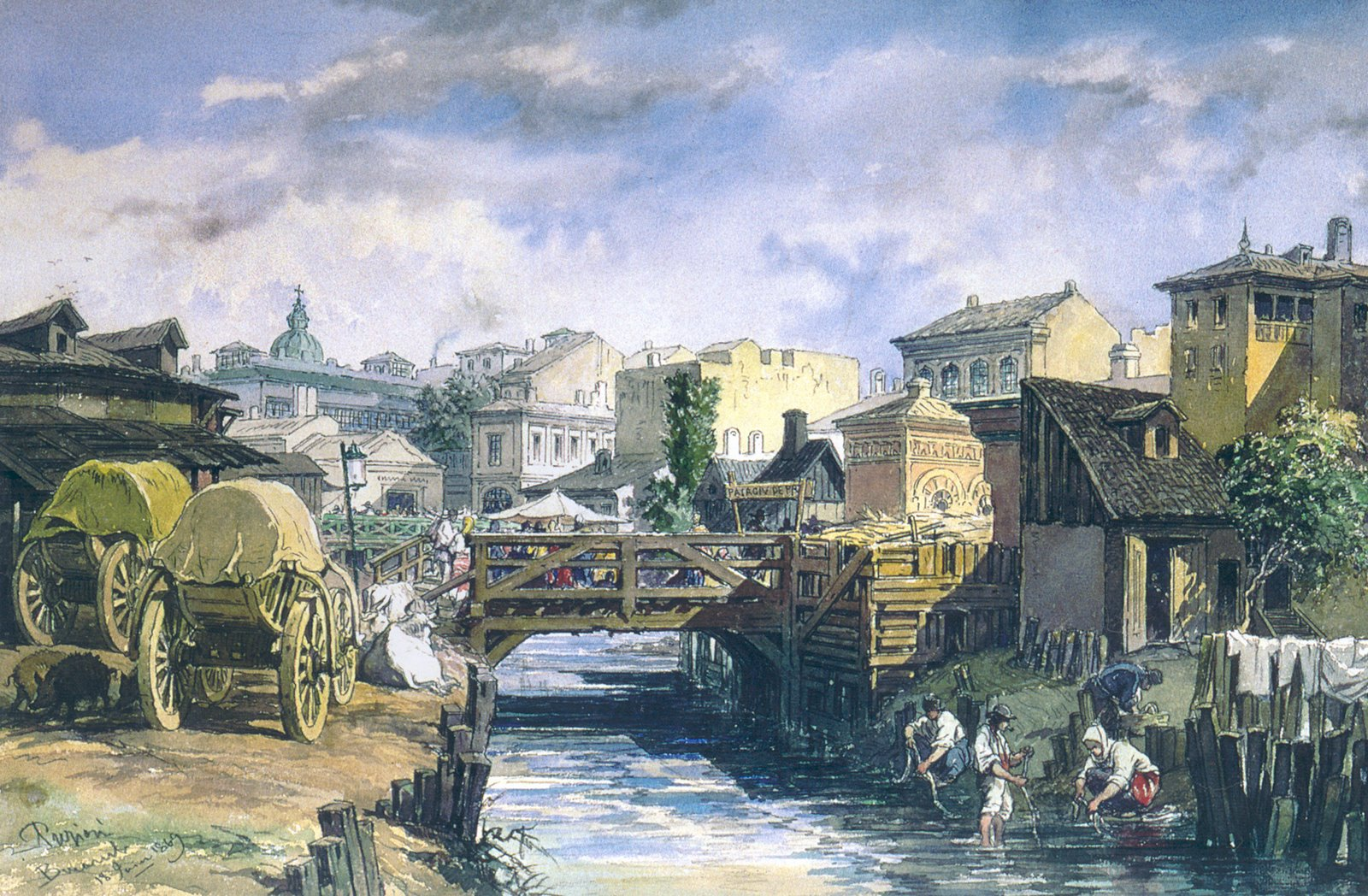
Bridge over Bucureștioara, watercolor by Amedeo Preziosi, 1869

Bucureștioara was a stream which was a tributary of the Dâmbovița River and flowed in Bucharest, Romania. It had its source in a lake which was located in the place where Grădina Icoanei and Ioanid Park are now located, a few hundred metres east of the present-day Piața Romană. Its name is a diminutive of București, the Romanian name of Bucharest. It flowed southward along what is now the Jean-Louis Calderon Street and then through the "Scaune" suburb (mahala), where its waters were used by the butchers (currently, the Hristo Botev Street) and finally it joined the Dâmbovița. The lake was drained in 1873 and the river bed was covered.
