= Andreea Părăluță =

Romanian footballer (born 1994)

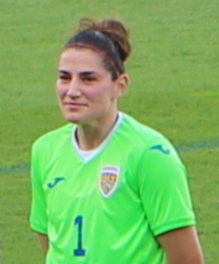

Personal information
- Date of birth: 27 November 1994 (age 31)
- Place of birth: Pucheni, Romania
- Height: 1.72 m (5 ft 8 in)
- Position: Goalkeeper

Team information
- Current team: Levante
- Number: 13

Senior career*
Years	Team	Apps	(Gls)
2009–2010	CSȘ Târgoviște		
2010–2016	ASA Târgu Mureș		
2016–2018	Atlético Madrid	11	(0)
2018–2023	Levante	67	(0)
2024–	Fortuna Hjørring	33	(0)

International career^{‡}
2011–	Romania	60	(0)
- * Club domestic league appearances and goals as of 13 August 2025 ‡ National team caps and goals as of 13 August 2025

Andreea Părăluță (born 27 November 1994) is a Romanian professional footballer who plays as a goalkeeper for Fortuna Hjørring and the Romania women's national team.

== Honours ==
ASA Târgu Mureș

- Cupa României (1): 2015–16

Atletico Madrid

- Primera División (2): 2016–17, 2017–18

Individual

- AFAN Best Football Player in Romania: 2015
