= Anglican Church (Bucharest) =

Church in Bucharest, Romania

Coordinates: 44°26′34.56″N 26°6′9.48″E

Church of the Resurrection
- Biserica Învierea Domnului (Romanian)
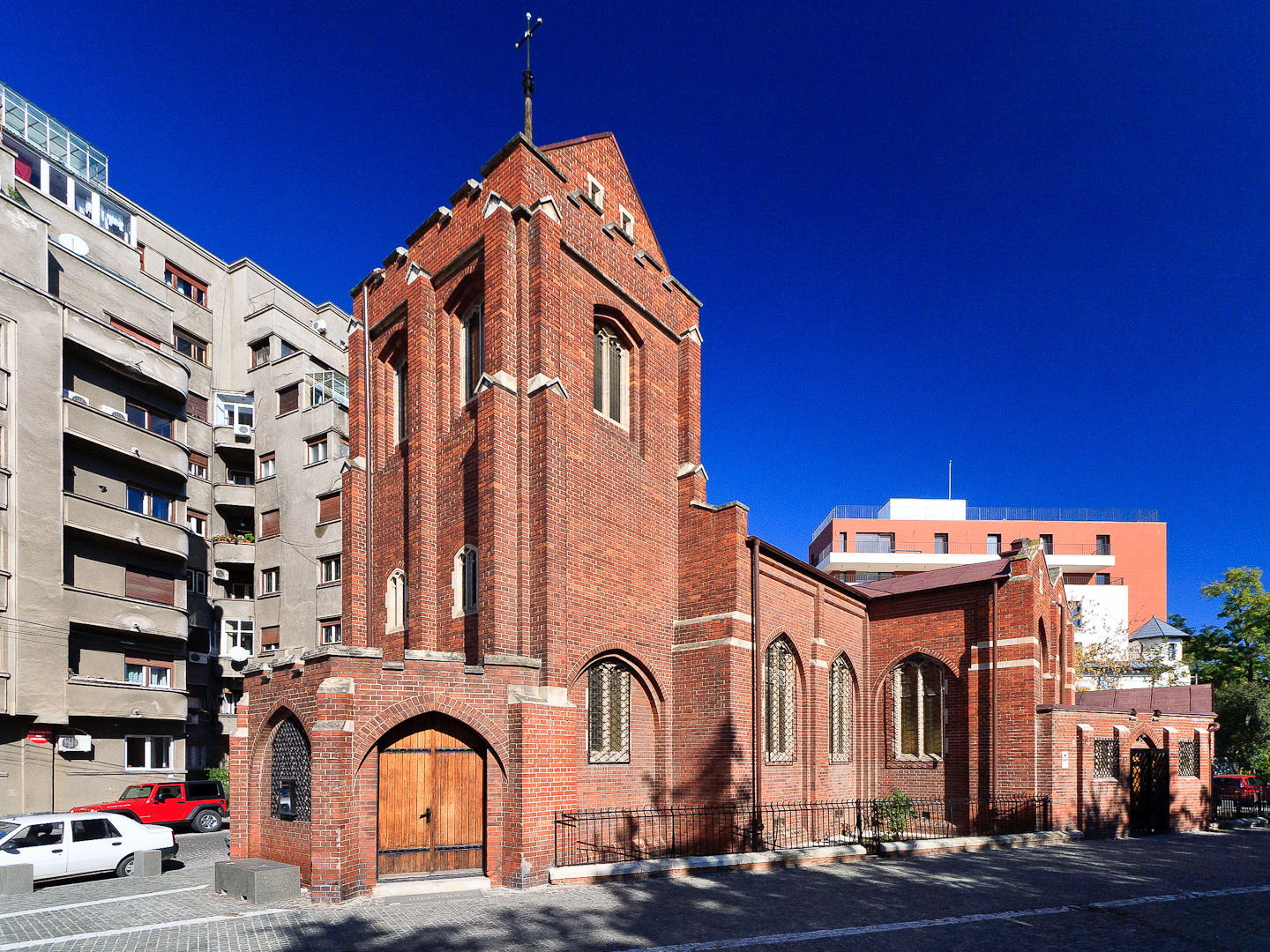
- The church in October 2010
- Church of the Resurrection
- Location: Bucharest
- Country: Romania
- Denomination: Church of England
- Tradition: Anglicanism
- Churchmanship: Liberal Catholic
- Website: www.anglicanbucharest.org

History
- Status: Chapel
- Consecrated: November 5, 1922

Architecture
- Architect: Victor Ștefănescu
- Style: Neo-Gothic
- Groundbreaking: 1900
- Completed: 1914

Administration
- Province: Canterbury
- Diocese: Diocese in Europe
- Archdeaconry: Eastern Archdeaconry

The Anglican Church of the Resurrection is a church located in central Bucharest, Romania, near Grădina Icoanei, at the intersection of Xenopol street and Arthur Verona street. The church is a red brick Neo-gothic style building.

== History ==
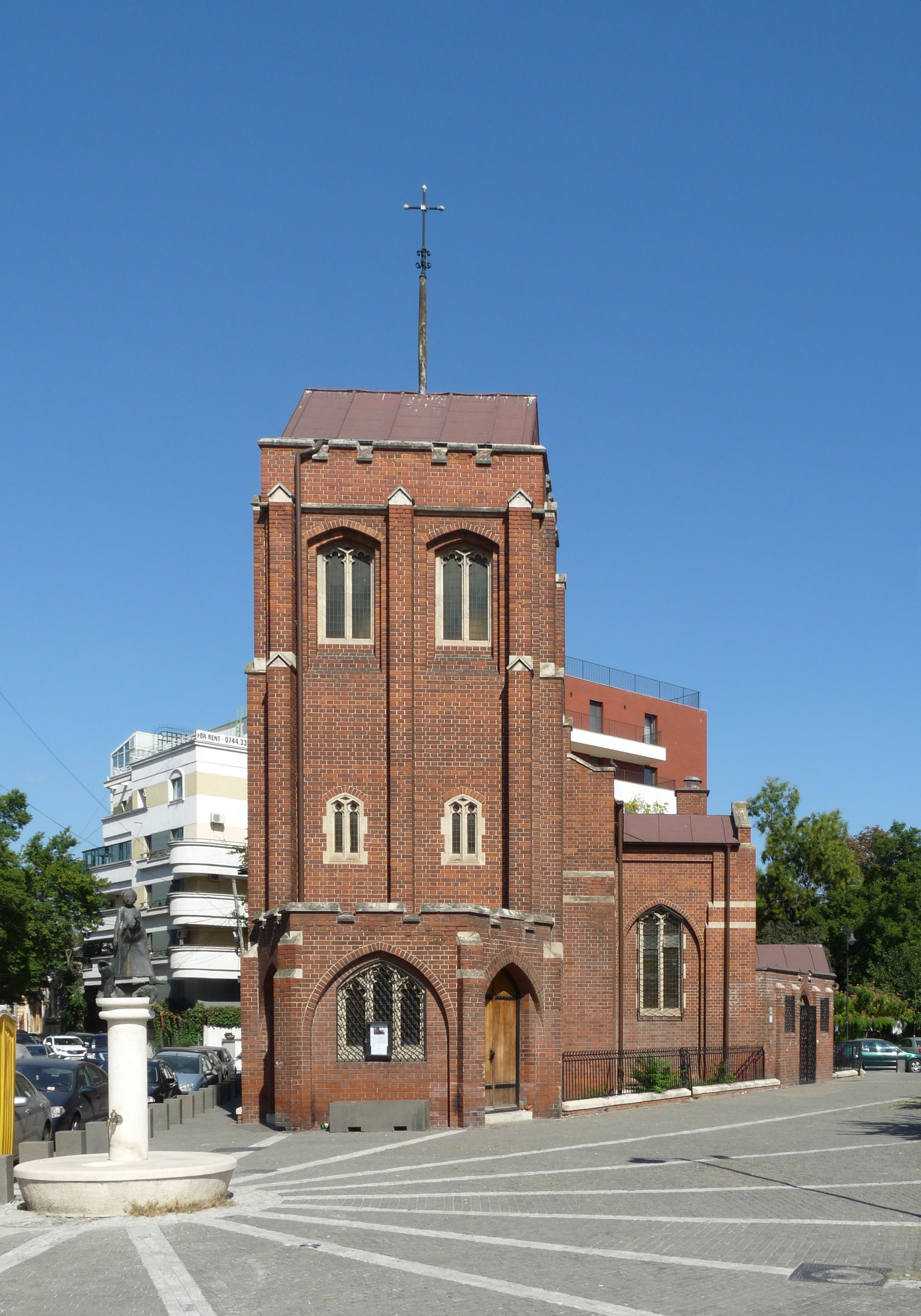
The church in 2012

The land on which the church was built was given by the Commune of Bucharest to the British Crown in December 1900. The outside of the building was completed in 1914, but the interiors (with furnishings from England) were finished only after World War I. The first service was held in 1920, and the church was dedicated on November 5, 1922 by the Bishop of Gibraltar.

During World War II the church was closed and maintained by a church guardian and cleaner who was paid by the Swiss Embassy. It was reopened only on Christmas Day 1944 with the help of the Royal Navy and American military staff. After the Communists seized power in Romania there was no permanent chaplain, services being held by visiting priests on a monthly basis. Starting in 1966 the church had a permanent priest.
