= Rodica Stănoiu =

Romanian jurist and politician (1939–2025)

Rodica Mihaela Stănoiu (10 May 1939 – 3 December 2025) was a Romanian jurist and politician. A member of the Social Democratic Party (PSD) and later the Conservative Party (PC), she was a member of the Romanian Senate for Olt County from 1996 to 2008, with a hiatus in March–December 2004. In the Adrian Năstase cabinet, she was Minister of Justice from 2000 to 2004.

== Life and career ==
Born in Nucet, Dâmbovița County, she attended the Law Faculty of the University of Bucharest from 1957 to 1961. She undertook Criminology studies at the Université de Montréal from 1968 to 1969, and obtained a Doctor of Law degree in Bucharest in 1974, with a thesis on International Criminal Law. She also studied Comparative Law at the University of Strasbourg in 1982. From 1961 to 2000, she worked as a scientific researcher at Bucharest's Institute for Judicial Studies (ICJ), advancing in rank in 1971 and again in 1990, when she became head of the Public Law Department. During her career as professor and researcher in criminal law and criminology, she authored or co-authored fourteen monographs, 130 studies and 30 reports to international congresses. She was also visiting professor at Strasbourg and the Université libre de Bruxelles (1985) and at Montreal (1988). Among her professional positions were as president of the Romanian Society of Criminology and Criminalistics, and as editor-in-chief of a law review.

Stănoiu worked as a secretary of state at the Labour Ministry from 1995 to 1996. She was elected senator three times: in 1996, 2000 and 2004. During her time in the Senate, she was on the committees for human rights, religious affairs and minorities (1996–2000); for revising the Constitution (2000–2004); for investigating abuses, combating corruption and petitions (2004–2006); and for defence, public order and national security (2007–2008). After the PDSR (PSD from 2001) won the 2000 election, incoming Prime Minister Adrian Năstase named her Justice Minister that December. Before the end of 2001, she had dismissed every prosecutor involved in anti-corruption trials and in trials of state officials accused of acts of repression during the bloody Romanian Revolution of 1989 that toppled the Communist regime. In July of that year, President Ion Iliescu appointed Stănoiu's husband to the Constitutional Court, raising fears of nepotism. He and Năstase decided to sack her in March 2004 following calls for her departure from the opposition National Liberal Party (PNL) and Democratic Party (PD), comments by a judge accusing her of being personally responsible for "chaos" in the justice system and for not wanting genuinely independent judges, and a draft report by the European Parliament's Committee on Foreign Affairs criticising Romania for lacking a politically independent judiciary. Right afterwards, Iliescu hired her as a presidential adviser, leading to her resignation from the Senate, as the two positions cannot be held simultaneously. Within her party, Stănoiu was a vice president from 1996 to 2000 and again from 2001.

Both during and after Stănoiu's ministerial service, her relationship with the pre-1989 Securitate secret police under Communism came under scrutiny. In autumn 2006, the CNSAS, an institution charged with investigating Securitate affiliations, declared her a collaborator based on a law later found unconstitutional. In response, she challenged the verdict and quit the PSD, joining the PC several months later. According to the CNSAS, while working at the ICJ in the 1980s, Stănoiu, code-named "Sanda", signed fifty-one notes reporting information about her colleagues, including her future boss Năstase, to the Securitate. Although graphologists have attested that the handwriting is hers, she claimed the notes were forgeries and refused to comment of whether she had collaborated with the secret police. A June 2012 ruling by a court in Oradea, where she requested the case be moved in order to avoid media publicity, upheld the CNSAS verdict, confirming that Stănoiu was "Sanda" and had collaborated with the Securitate. The ruling is subject to appeal. In January 2001, her first major appointment while minister was former top Securitate official General Marian Ureche as director of the ministry's intelligence service. Later, he was revealed to have been Securitate supervisor at the ICJ, and she fought to keep him until the extent of his involvement in controversial intelligence work before and after 1989 emerged and led to his ouster in November 2003.

Stănoiu died on 3 December 2025, at the age of 86.
