= Mircea Georgescu =

Romanian footballer

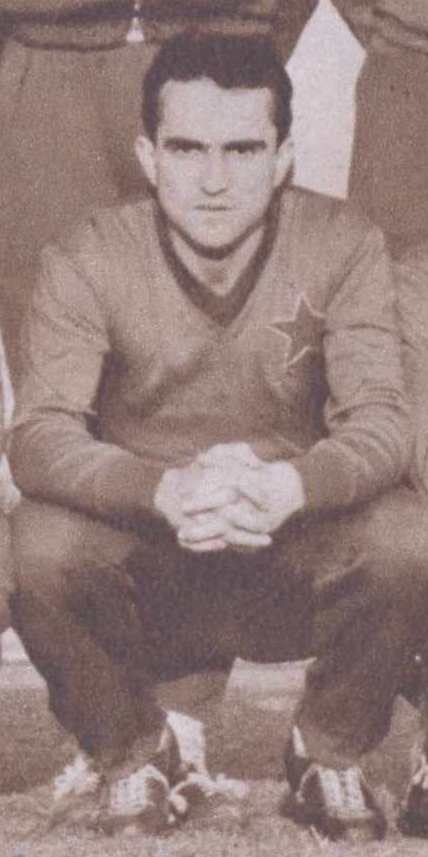
- Georgescu in 1965

Personal information
- Date of birth: 8 July 1938 (age 88)
- Place of birth: Pucheni, Romania
- Date of death: 3 december 2021
- Place of death: Mangalia, Romania
- Position: Right back

Senior career*
| Years | Team | Apps | (Gls) |
| 1958–1960 | Prahova Ploiești | | |
| 1960–1963 | Politehnica Timișoara | 57 | (7) |
| 1963–1966 | Steaua București | 46 | (0) |
| 1966–1969 | Farul Constanța | 43 | (2) |
| Total | | 146 | (9) |

International career
| 1962 | Romania | 2 | (0) |
- * Club domestic league appearances and goals

Mircea Georgescu (born 8 July 1938) is a Romanian former footballer who played as a defender.

== International career ==
Mircea Georgescu played three games at international level for Romania, including a 6–0 loss against Spain at the 1964 European Nations' Cup qualifiers.

== Honours ==
Steaua București

- Cupa României: 1965–66, runner-up 1963–64
