= Ovidiu Iacov =

Romanian footballer

Personal information
- Full name: Ovidiu Nicolae Iacov
- Date of birth: 18 July 1981
- Place of birth: Pucheni, Romania
- Date of death: 21 December 2001 (aged 20)
- Place of death: Valea Voievozilor, Romania
- Position: Midfielder

Youth career
- Clubul Sportiv Şcolar Nucet

Senior career*
Years	Team	Apps	(Gls)
1999–2001	Steaua București	4	(1)
Total		4	(1)
- * Club domestic league appearances and goals

Ovidiu Nicolae Iacov (18 July 1981 – 21 December 2001) was a Romanian footballer. During his career he played only for Steaua București.

He debuted in Divizia A on 9 June 2000, in Mediaş, scoring a goal in a 3–1 win for his team, Steaua. This was to be his only goal scored in Divizia A, in 4 matches played.

Iacov died in a car accident when his Volkswagen crashed into a concrete sidewall near Valea Voievozilor, Târgoviște. Iacov was found to have been driving under the influence of alcohol, without a licence, late at night. Three other players from Chindia Târgoviște were riding with him on the back seats, but they all escaped with minor injuries. The driver's girlfriend, in the passenger seat, also died.
