= Budești, Vâlcea =

Budești
- Commune
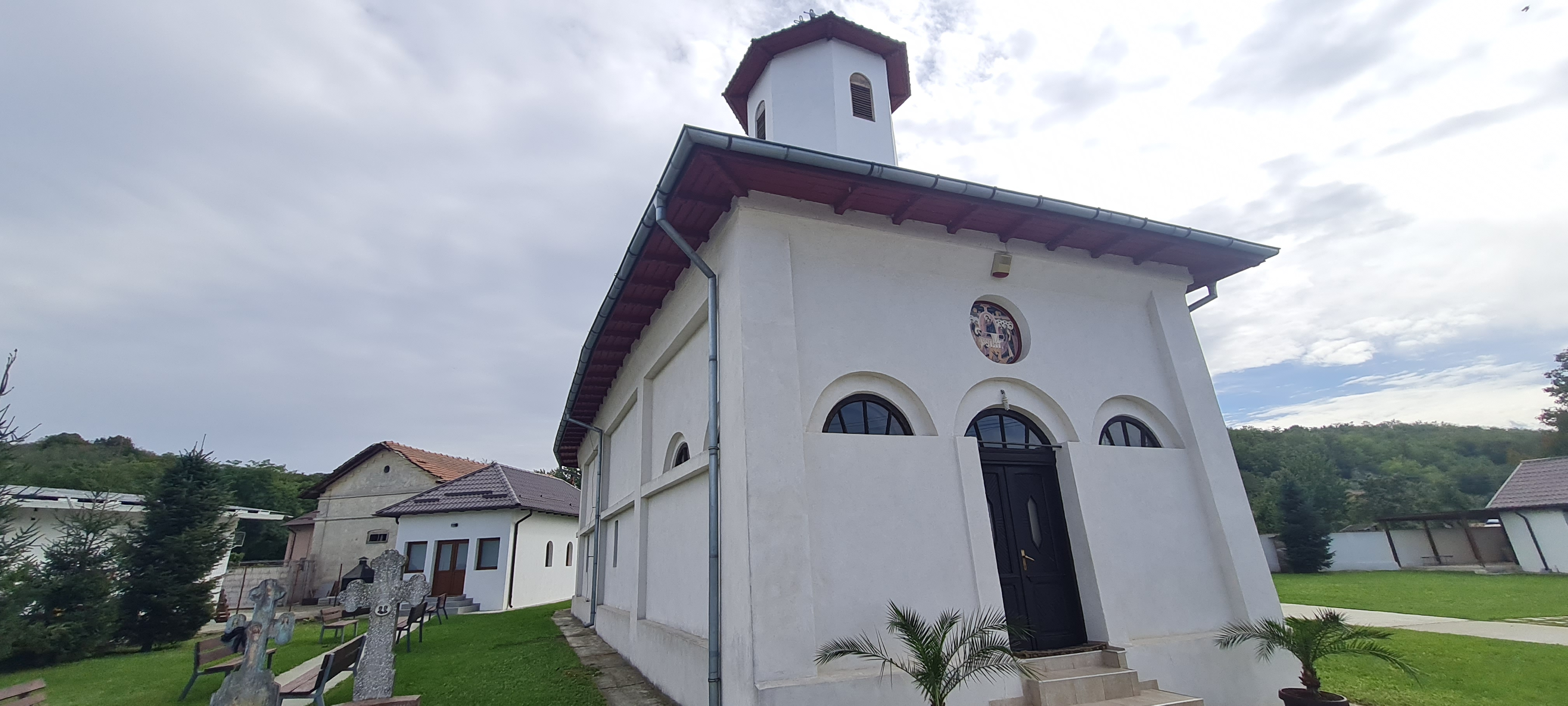
- Church of the Dormition in Bârsești

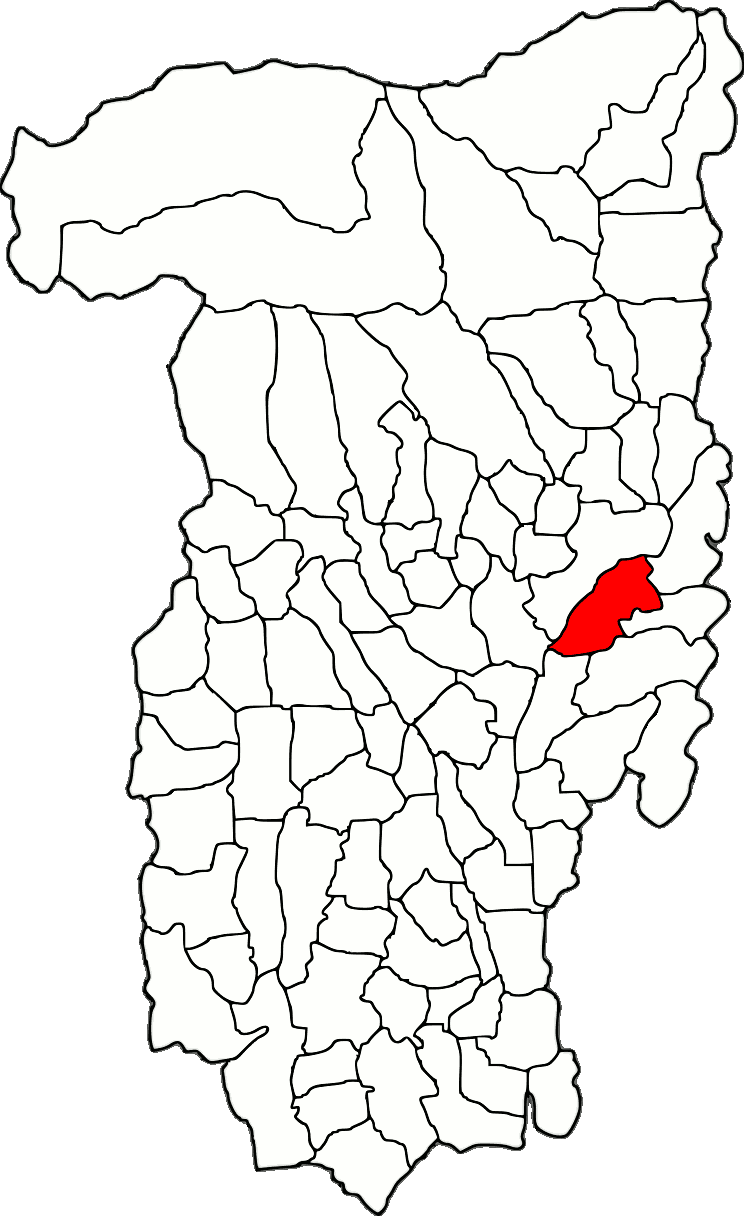
- Location in Vâlcea County

- Location in Romania
- Coordinates: 45.0444°N 24.3729°E
- Country: Romania
- County: Vâlcea

Government
  - Mayor (2024–2028): Ion Vlădulescu (PNL)
- Area: 56.65 km^{2} (21.87 sq mi)
- Elevation: 255 m (837 ft)
- Population (2021-12-01): 6,652
  - Density: 117.4/km^{2} (304.1/sq mi)
- Time zone: UTC+02:00 (EET)
  - Summer (DST): UTC+03:00 (EEST)
- Postal code: 247055
- Area code: +(40) 250
- Vehicle reg.: VL
- Website: primaria-budesti.ro

Budești is a commune located in Vâlcea County, Romania. It is composed of eight villages: Barza, Bercioiu, Bârsești, Budești, Linia, Piscu Pietrei, Racovița, and Ruda. It is situated in the historical region of Muntenia.

Historical population
Year	Pop.	±%
2002	5,458	—
2011	5,694	+4.3%
2021	6,652	+16.8%
Source: Census data
