= Grădina Icoanei =

Park in Bucharest, Romania

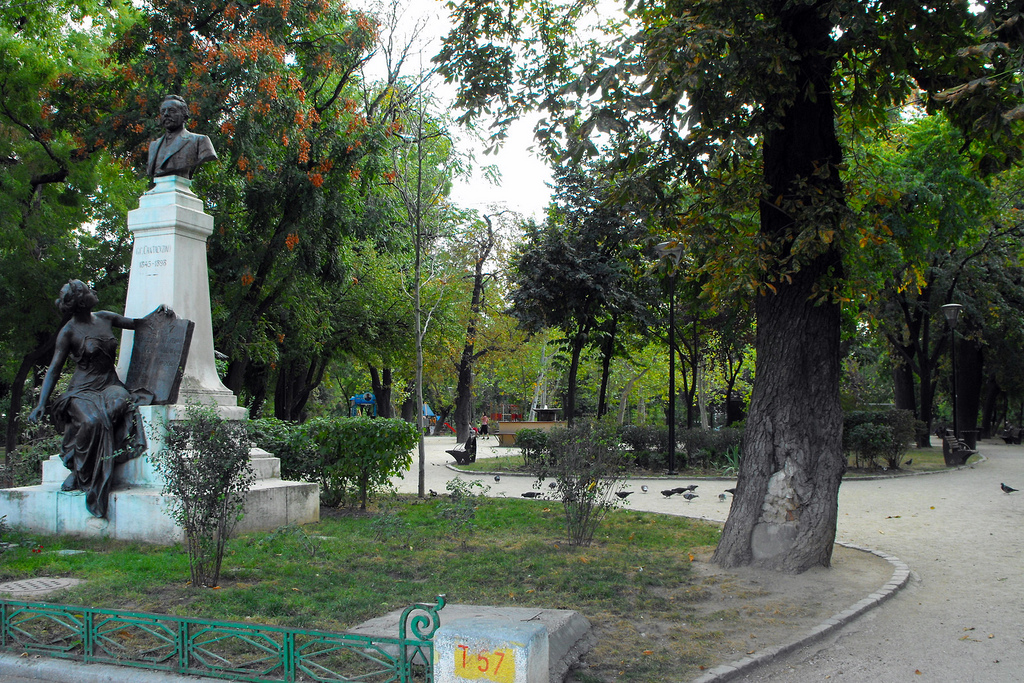
- Statue of George C. Cantacuzino-Râfoveanu at the entrance of the park

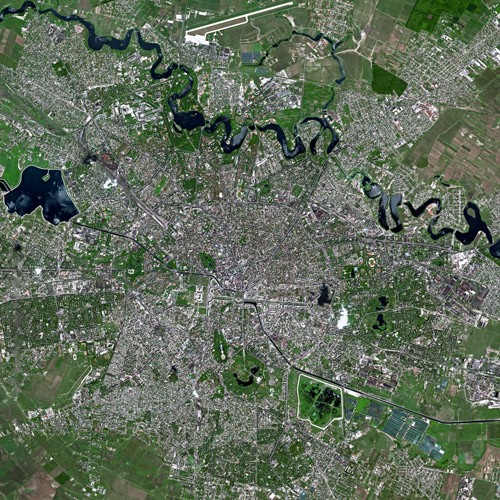
- Location within Bucharest, Romania
- Location: Bucharest, Romania
- Coordinates: 44°26′36.92″N 26°6′14.49″E
- Area: 2.4 hectares (5.9 acres)
- Established: 1873
- Administrator: Administrația Lacuri, Parcuri și Agrement București
- Status: Open all year
- Public transit: Piața Romană metro station
- Designers: Karl Kuchnovsky; Louis Leyvraz

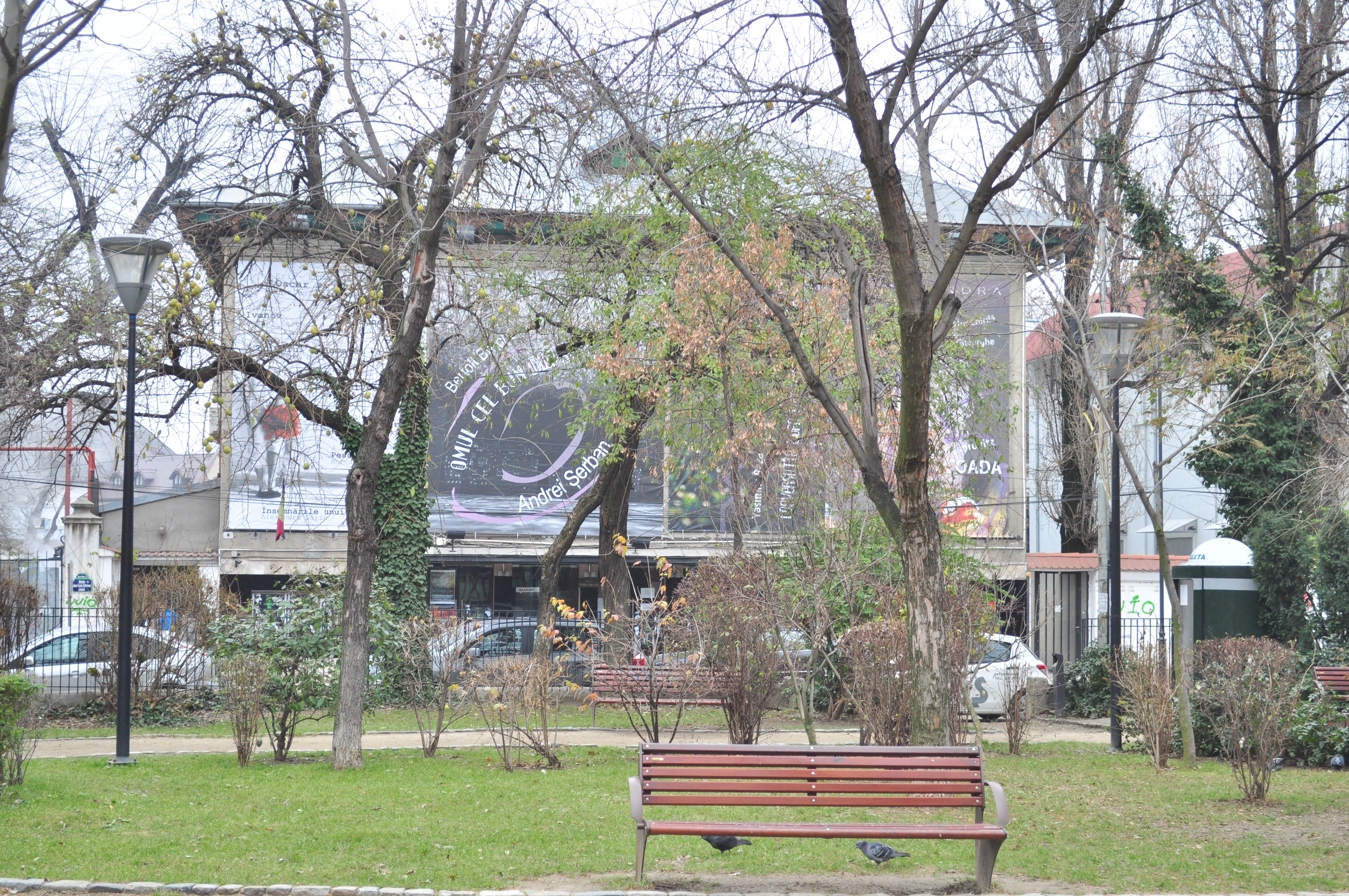
The Bulandra Theatre with the Toma Caragiu stage, viewed from Grădina Icoanei

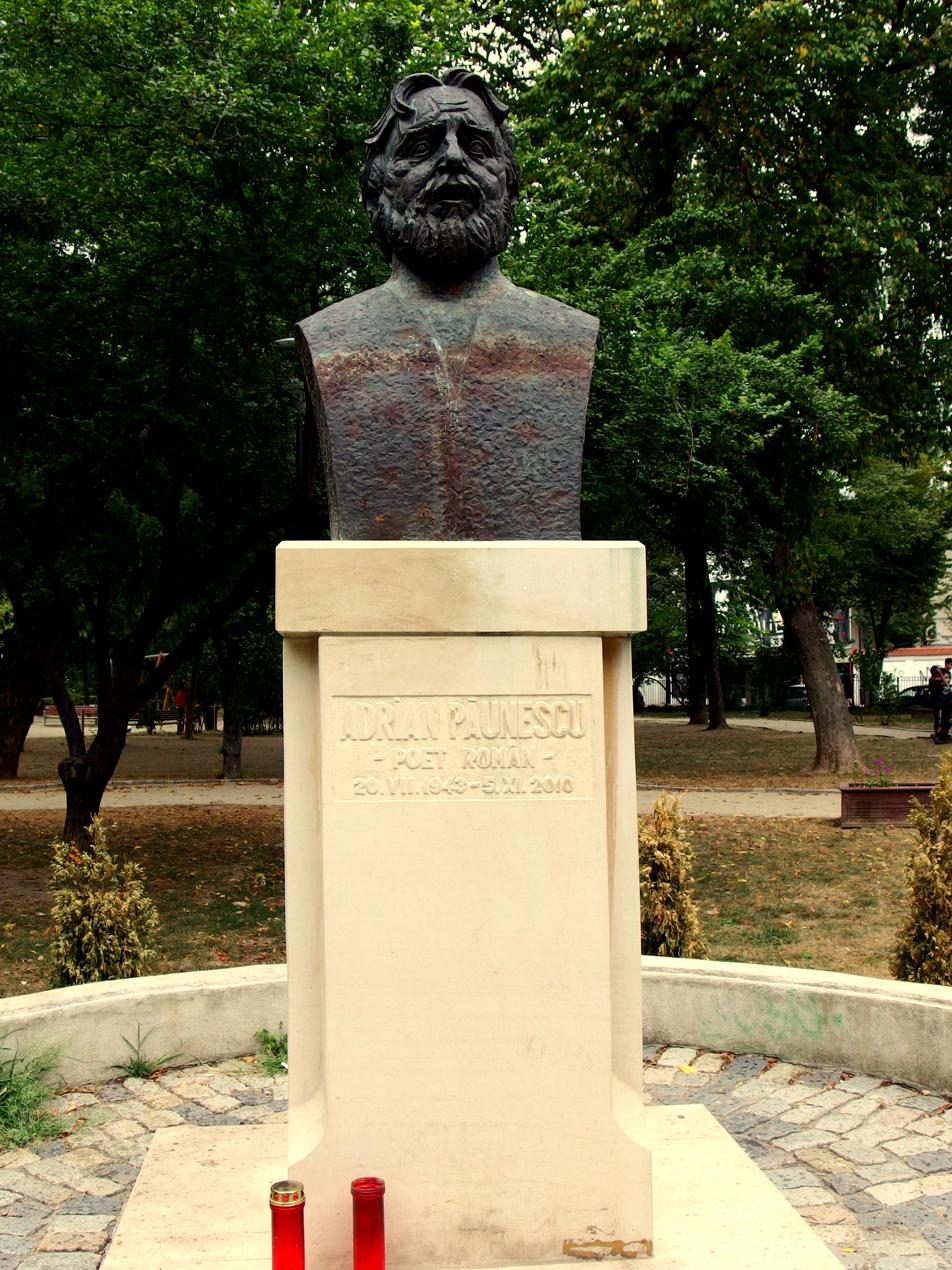
Bust of Adrian Păunescu

Grădina Icoanei ("Icon's Garden") is a small park in central Bucharest, situated not far away from Piața Romană and Bulevardul Magheru. The park, located next to Gheorghe Cantacuzino Plaza in Sector 2 of the city, was inaugurated in 1873.

The park has a surface area of 2.4 hectares (5.9 acres) and attracts an average of 1,100 visitors on a weekend day. The Bulandra Theatre (the Toma Caragiu stage, Sala Toma Caragiu), Ioanid Park (now called "Ion Voicu"), the Icoanei Church, and the Anglican Church are located in the park's immediate vicinity. The name of the park comes from an icon of Mary, made by Filip Nicolau Argintarul in 1682; the icon, given by Prince Constantin Brâncoveanu to his wife, Doamna Marica, is today in the nave of Icoanei Church.

The park is listed as a historic monument by Romania's Ministry of Culture and Religious Affairs.

== History ==
In a city plan from 1852, the area occupied now by the park was designated as Maidanul Stăpânirii, signifying a city-owned town square. In the area was the Icoana Pond, from which the Bucureștioara brook sprang, and a wooded grove, which formed the nucleus of the present-day park. The pond, which covered some 20 hectares (49 acres), was drained between 1832 and 1846, during the urban development efforts prompted by General Pavel Kiseleff and the Organic Regulations. The construction of the park was done in 1870–1873, based on plans drawn by the architect Karl Kuchnovsky and approved by Grigore Cerchez, while the landscaping was done by the horticulturist Louis Leyvraz in 1873. At that time, the garden was at the outskirts of the city; it was a place where parties were held, lovers met, and fiddlers sang among the bushes.

At the northern entrance of the park, a statue of George C. Cantacuzino-Râfoveanu, made by French sculptor Ernest Henri Dubois, was inaugurated in 1904. A female character is at the base of the statue, holding a tablet with her left hand; the feather she was holding in her right hand has since disappeared. At the southern edge of Grădina Icoanei is the bronze bust of Adrian Păunescu, a poet who lived near the park; the bust, made by the sculptors Ioan Deac-Bistrița and Dragoș Neagoe, was inaugurated in 2012.

From November 2021 to February 2022, the park was completely renovated, under a 2.7 million leis contract; the two fountains were changed and the main lanes, originally covered with sand, were paved with a layer of crushed limestone, on top of which a layer of gravel was laid.
