= Tătărani =

- Commune
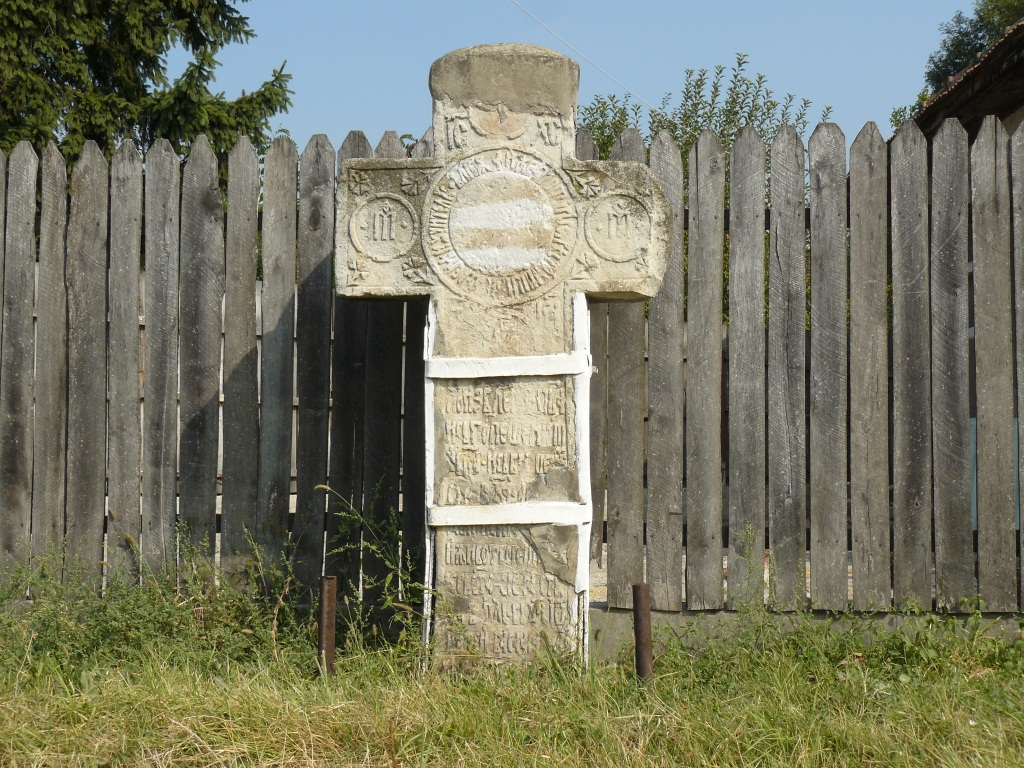
- Wayside cross in Gheboieni village

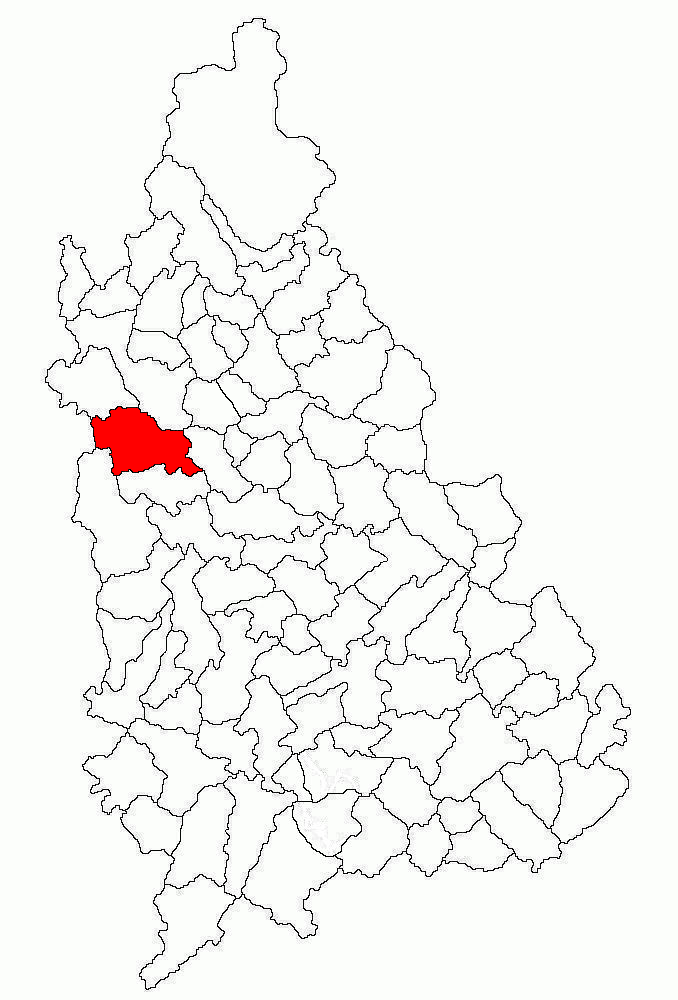
- Location in Dâmbovița County

- Location in Romania
- Coordinates: 45°0′N 25°17′E
- Country: Romania
- County: Dâmbovița

Government
  - Mayor (2020–2024): Constantin Pătru (PSD)
- Area: 63.8 km^{2} (24.6 sq mi)
- Elevation: 352 m (1,155 ft)
- Population (2021-12-01): 5,228
  - Density: 81.9/km^{2} (212/sq mi)
- Time zone: UTC+02:00 (EET)
  - Summer (DST): UTC+03:00 (EEST)
- Postal code: 137440
- Area code: +(40) 245
- Vehicle reg.: DB
- Website: primariatatarani.ro

Tătărani is a commune in Dâmbovița County, Muntenia, Romania with a population of 5,228 people as of 2021. It is composed of four villages: Căprioru, Gheboieni, Priboiu, and Tătărani.

The commune is situated in a hilly area between the Wallachian Plain and the Southern Carpathians. It lies on the banks of the Dâmbovița River; the river Aninoasa discharges into the Dâmbovița in Căprioru village.

Tătărani is located in the northwestern part of Dâmbovița County, 22 km (14 mi) from the county seat, Târgoviște, on the border with Argeș County. It is traversed on the left bank of the Dâmbovița River by national road DN72A, which connects Târgoviște to Câmpulung.

Historical population
Year	Pop.	±%
2002	5,478	—
2011	5,225	−4.6%
2021	5,228	+0.1%
Source: Census data
