= Aninoasa (Dâmbovița) =

- Location within Romania

Location
- Country: Romania
- Counties: Dâmbovița County

Physical characteristics
- Mouth: Dâmbovița
  - coordinates: 44.9835°N 25.2854°E
- Length: 15 km (9.3 mi)
- Basin size: 24 km^{2} (9.3 sq mi)

Basin features
- Progression: Dâmbovița→ Argeș→ Danube→ Black Sea

The Aninoasa is a right tributary of the river Dâmbovița in Romania. It discharges into the Dâmbovița in Căprioru. Its length is 15 km (9.3 mi) and its basin size is 24 km^{2} (9.3 sq mi).
