= Valea Bădenilor =

Valea Bădenilor Bădeanca
- Location within Romania

Location
- Country: Romania
- Counties: Argeș County
- Villages: Valea Bădenilor, Bădeni

Physical characteristics
- Source: Leaota Mountains
- Mouth: Dâmbovița
  - location: Bădeni
  - coordinates: 45.2414°N 25.1774°E
- Length: 15 km (9.3 mi)
- Basin size: 56 km^{2} (22 sq mi)

Basin features
- Progression: Dâmbovița→ Argeș→ Danube→ Black Sea

The Valea Bădenilor (also: Bădeanca) is a left tributary of the river Dâmbovița in Romania. Its source is in the Leaota Mountains. It flows into the Dâmbovița in Bădeni. Its length is 15 km (9.3 mi) and its basin size is 56 km^{2} (22 sq mi).

== Tributaries ==
The following rivers are tributaries to the river Valea Bădenilor (from source to mouth):

- Left: Valea Râiosului, Valea Vâjei, Tâncava, Tăbra, Valea Gruiului
- Right: Valea Hotarului, Valea Făgețelului, Valea Babei, Valea Rea, Valea lui Brusture, Valea lui Dăniș
