= Călinești (Olt) =

- Location within Romania

Location
- Country: Romania
- Counties: Vâlcea County

Physical characteristics
- Mouth: Olt
  - location: Călinești
  - coordinates: 45.3766°N 24.2987°E
- Length: 18 km (11 mi)
- Basin size: 43 km^{2} (17 sq mi)

Basin features
- Progression: Olt→ Danube→ Black Sea

The Călinești is a right tributary of the river Olt in Romania. It discharges into the Olt in the village Călinești. Its length is 18 km (11 mi) and its basin size is 43 km^{2} (17 sq mi).

== Tributaries ==
The following rivers are tributaries to the river Călinești (from source to mouth):

- Left: Murgașul Mare, Lupul, Lotriorul
- Right: Izvorul Sașa, Aninoasa, Pârâul Sulițelor
