= Ion Șerb =

Ion Șerb, also Ioan Șerb (January 11, 1926 – January 5, 2004) was a general of the Socialist Republic of Romania accused of espionage for the Soviet Union.

Șerb was born in Malu cu Flori, Dâmbovița County. After the August 1944 coup d'état, he volunteered for service in the Tudor Vladimirescu Division; promoted to sergeant, he was awarded after the war the Medal of Faithful Service with swords, 3rd class. He then became a non-commissioned officer in the Muscel Gendarmerie Legion (1947–1948). From 1948 to 1949, he attended the M.A.I. Officers' School no. 1 in Bucharest, in the border guard specialty. On August 23, 1949, he was promoted to the rank of second lieutenant and assigned to the Border Guard Training Center in Rădăuți, in the position of political deputy of a company commander. Between November 1950 and July 1952, captain Șerb was sent by the Communist authorities to study at the K. Е. Voroshilov Higher Military Academy in Moscow. On July 30, 1955, colonel Șerb was promoted to major general, at the age of 29. In 1969, he advanced in rank to lieutenant general and was appointed commander of the Second Army (Muntenia) and of the Bucharest garrison.

A declassified CIA document states the following. Romanian counter-intelligence monitored several high-rank officers suspecting them in sympathies for the Soviet Union. In 1971 unauthorized documents were found during the search of the house of Ion Șerb, and in subsequent interrogations he confessed he was recruited by the Soviet military attaché to Romania, Aleksandr Fyodorovich Musatov, a known GRU officer. In order to avoid confrontation with the Soviet Union, Șerb was not prosecuted, but demoted to the rank of private.

After the Romanian Revolution of December 1989, he joined the Socialist Party of Labour, founded by the former communist prime minister Ilie Verdeț and, in June 1996, he was elected mayor of Malu cu Flori. He died in his native commune in 2004.
