= Cascue =

- Location within Romania

Location
- Country: Romania
- Counties: Argeș

Physical characteristics
- Source: Iezer Mountains
- Mouth: Dâmbovița
  - coordinates: 45.5090°N 25.1388°E
- Length: 5 km (3.1 mi)
- Basin size: 13 km^{2} (5.0 sq mi)

Basin features
- Progression: Dâmbovița→ Argeș→ Danube→ Black Sea
- Tributaries
  - left: Roșca
  - right: Rătei, Puturosu

The Cascue is a right tributary of the river Dâmbovița in Romania. Its source is near the Păpușa Peak, in the Iezer Mountains. Its length is 5 km (3.1 mi) and its basin size is 13 km^{2} (5.0 sq mi).
