= Pucheni =

- Commune
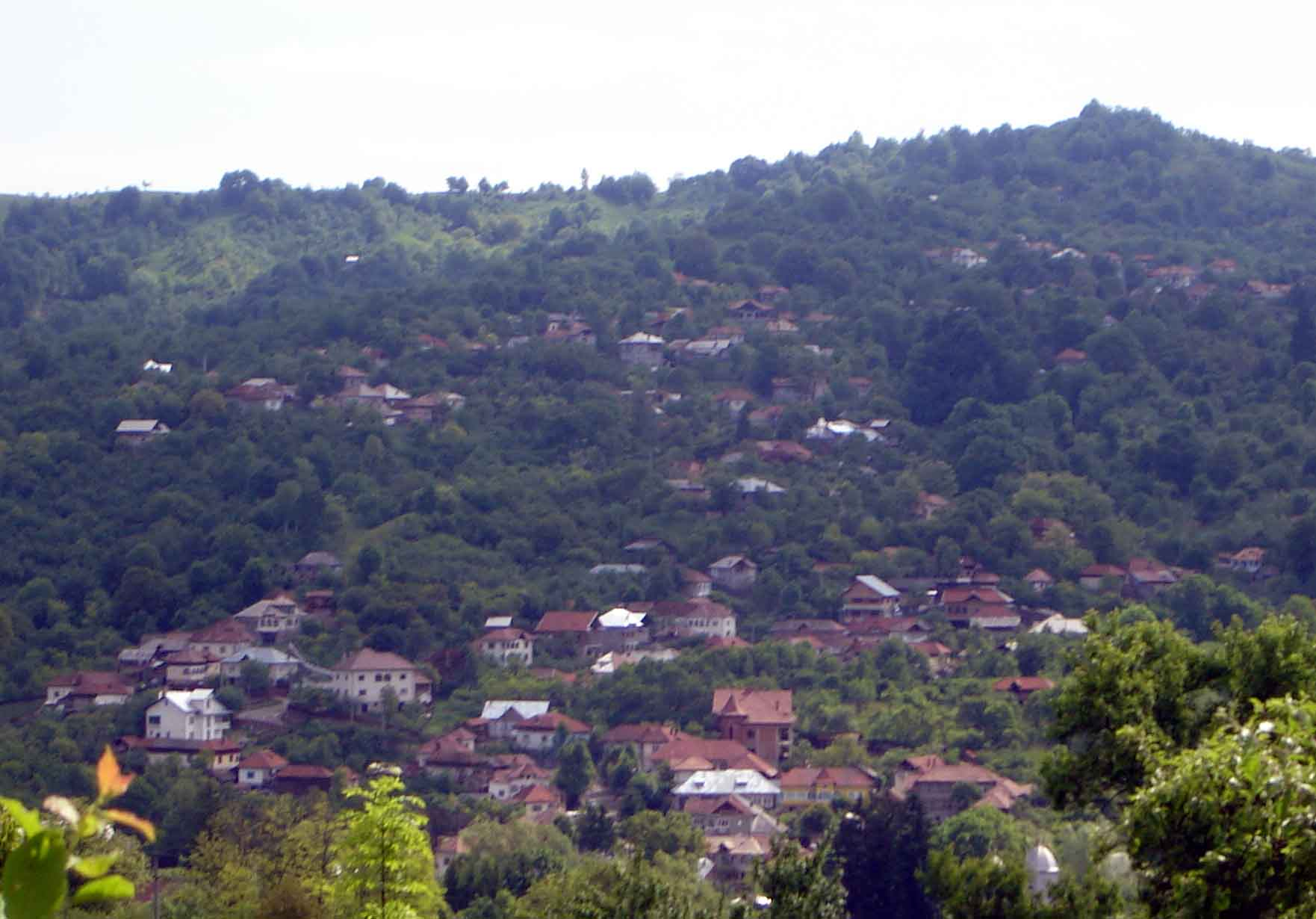

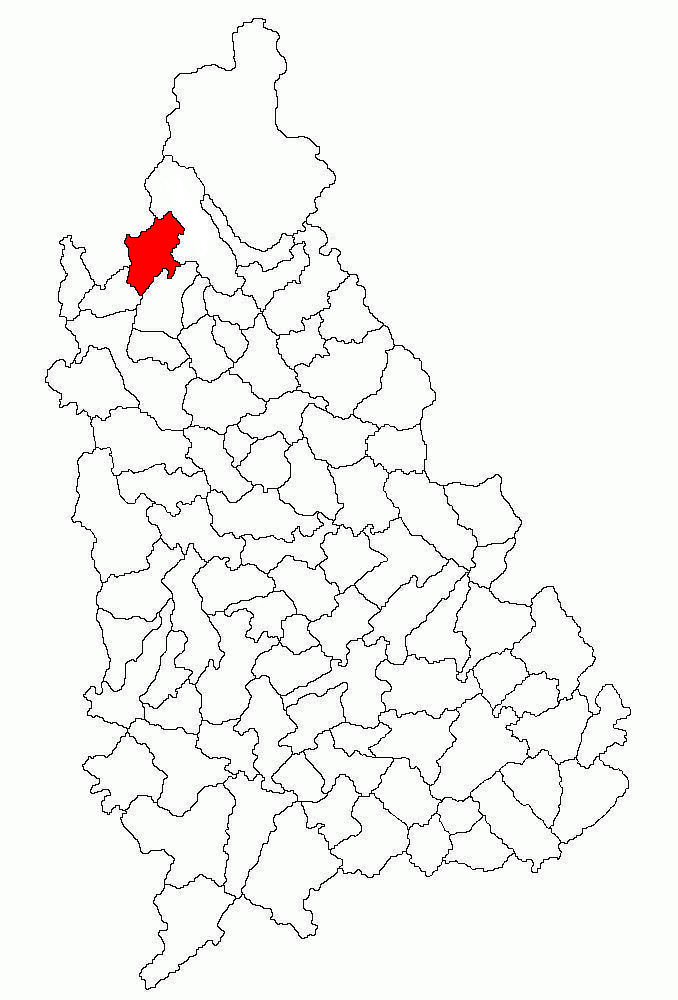
- Location in Dâmbovița County

- Location in Romania
- Coordinates: 45°11′N 25°16′E
- Country: Romania
- County: Dâmbovița

Government
  - Mayor (2020–2024): Corneliu Nistor (PSD)
- Area: 35.2 km^{2} (13.6 sq mi)
- Elevation: 600 m (2,000 ft)
- Population (2021-12-01): 1,558
  - Density: 44.3/km^{2} (115/sq mi)
- Time zone: UTC+02:00 (EET)
  - Summer (DST): UTC+03:00 (EEST)
- Postal code: 137380
- Area code: +(40) 245
- Vehicle reg.: DB
- Website: primariapucheni.ro

Pucheni is a commune in Dâmbovița County, Muntenia, Romania with a population of 1,558 people as of 2021. It is composed of five villages: Brădățel, Meișoare, Pucheni, Valea Largă, and Vârfureni.

The commune is located in the northern part of the county, on the border with Argeș County.

Historical population
Year	Pop.	±%
2002	2,222	—
2011	1,861	−16.2%
2021	1,558	−16.3%
Source: Census data

== Natives ==
- Răzvan Cojanu (born 1987), boxer
- Mircea Georgescu (born 1938), footballer
- Ovidiu Iacov (1981– 2001), footballer
- Andreea Părăluță (born 1994), footballer
