= Stoenești, Argeș =

Stoenești
- Commune
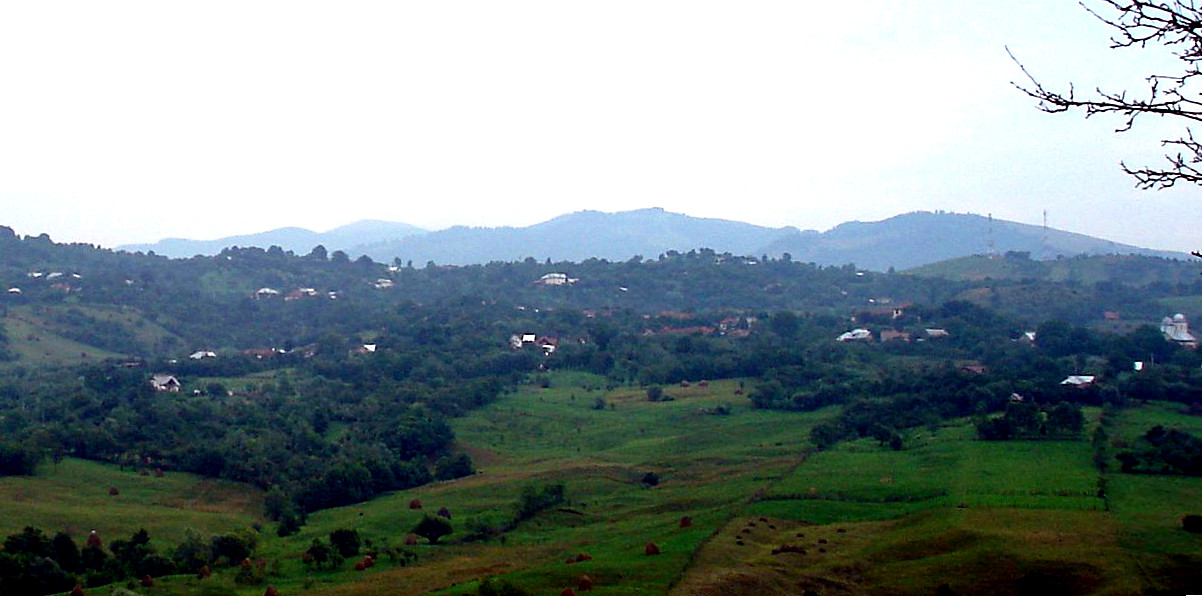
- Piatra

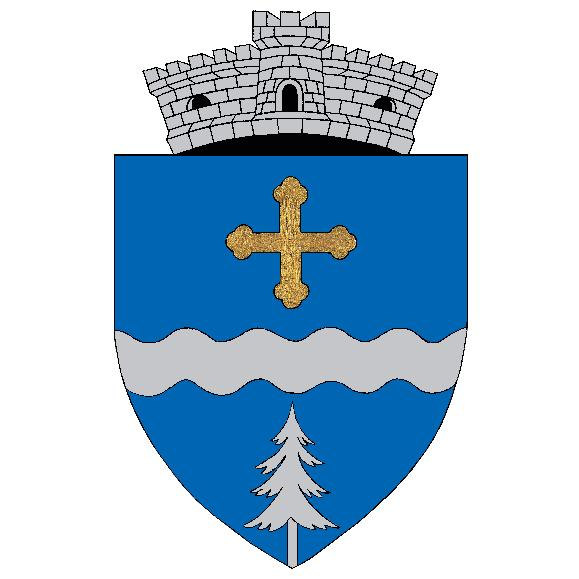
- Coat of arms

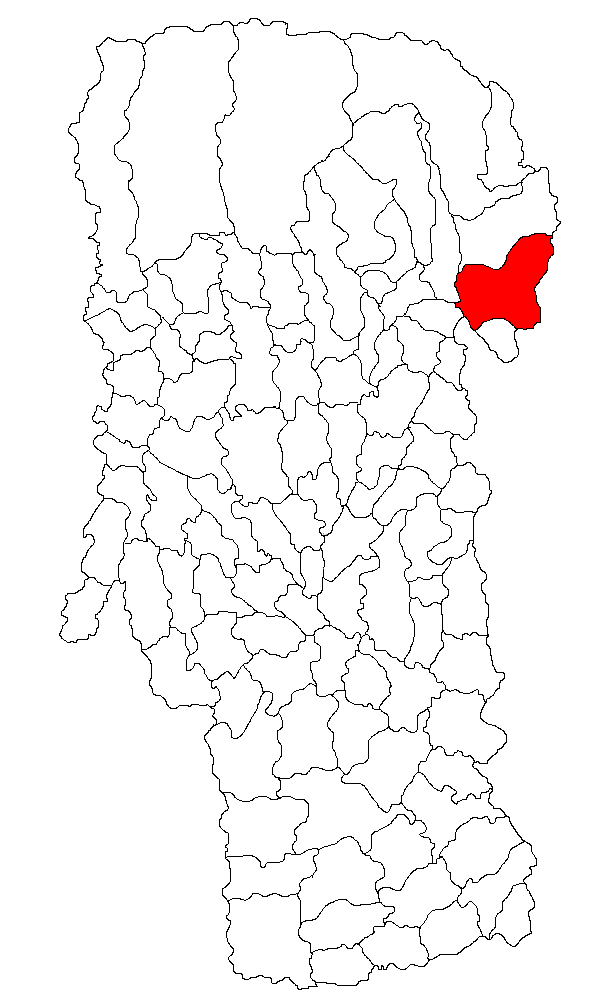
- Location in Argeș County

- Location in Romania
- Coordinates: 45°15′N 25°10′E
- Country: Romania
- County: Argeș

Government
  - Mayor (2020–2024): Ion Marin (PSD)
- Area: 109.21 km^{2} (42.17 sq mi)
- Elevation: 575 m (1,886 ft)
- Population (2021-12-01): 3,895
  - Density: 35.67/km^{2} (92.37/sq mi)
- Time zone: UTC+02:00 (EET)
  - Summer (DST): UTC+03:00 (EEST)
- Postal code: 117675
- Vehicle reg.: AG
- Website: primariastoenestiag.ro

Stoenești is a commune in Argeș County, Muntenia, Romania. It is composed of seven villages: Bădeni, Cotenești, Lunca Gârtii, Piatra, Slobozia, Stoenești, and Valea Bădenilor.

The commune lies in the foothills of the Southern Carpathians, on the banks of the Dâmbovița River. It is located in the northeastern part of Argeș County, on the border with Dâmbovița County.

Georgiana Văcaru, born in 1976 in Stoenești, is the woman with the most children in Romania (20 in all).
