= Malu cu Flori =

- Commune
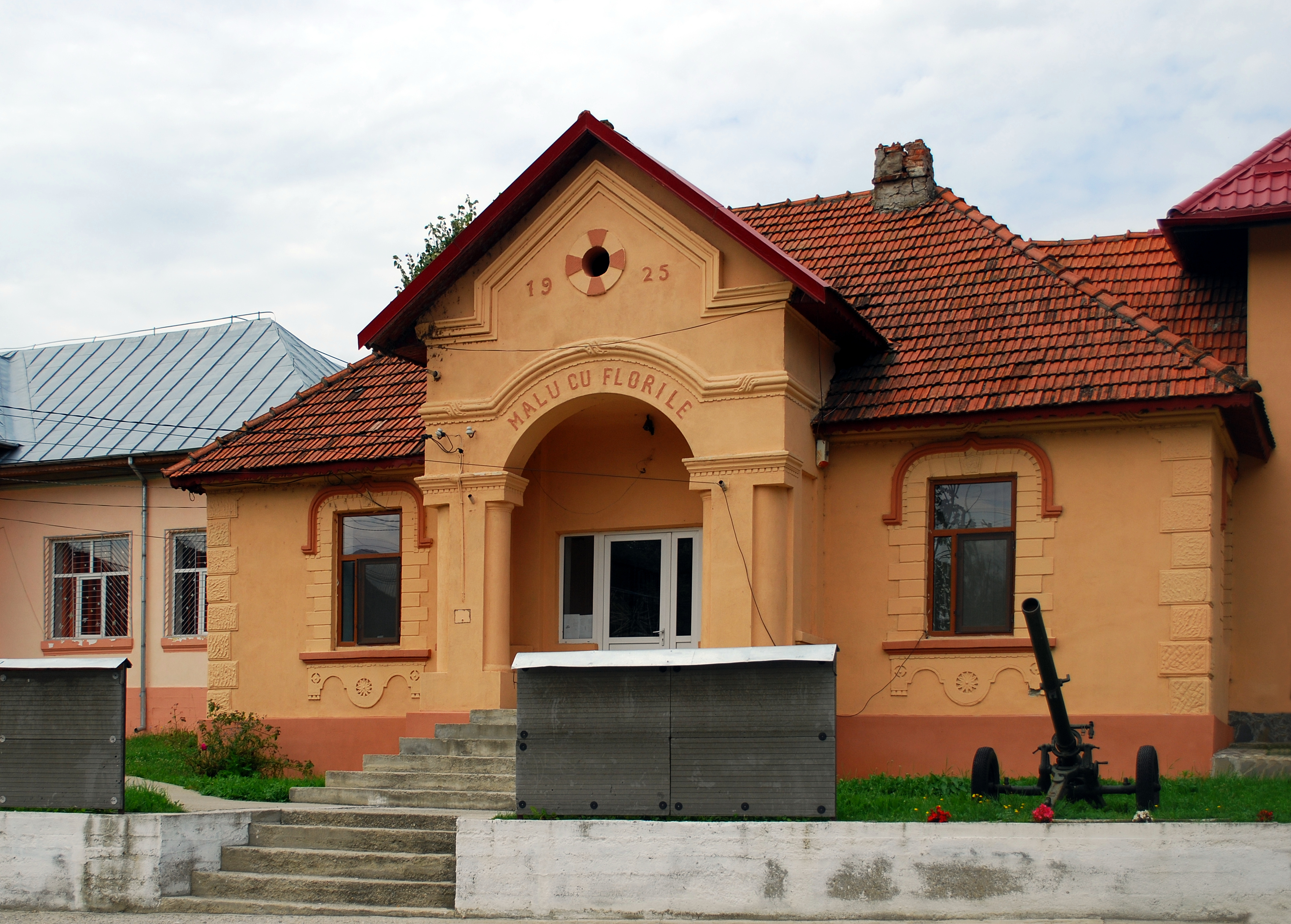
- Old town hall

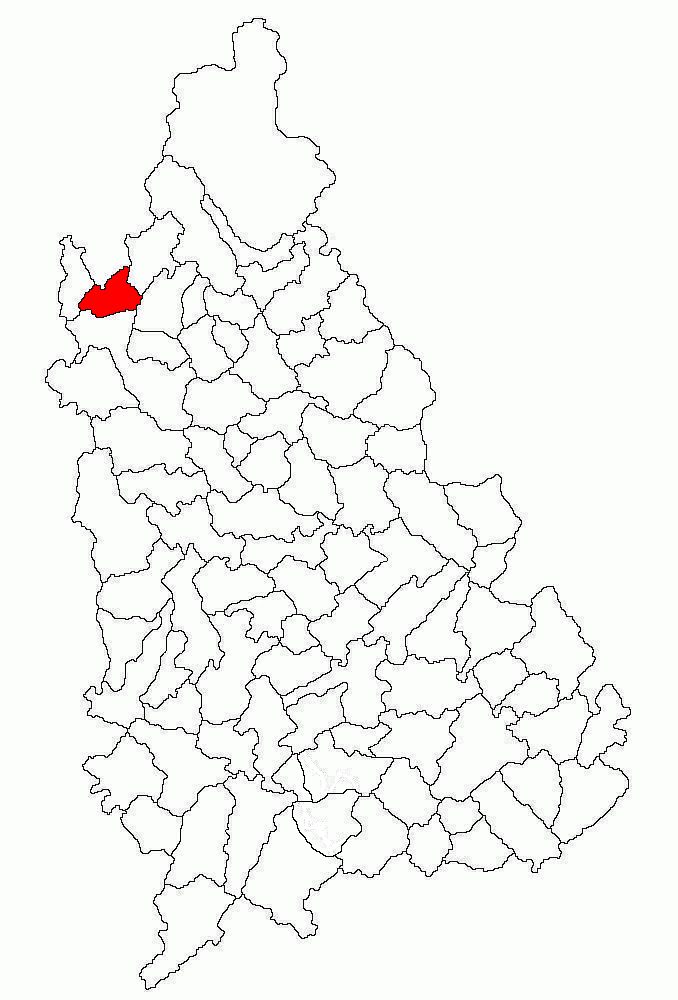
- Location in Dâmbovița County

- Location in Romania
- Coordinates: 45°9′N 25°12′E
- Country: Romania
- County: Dâmbovița

Government
  - Mayor (2020–2024): Ion Constantin (PSD)
- Area: 22.71 km^{2} (8.77 sq mi)
- Elevation: 600 m (2,000 ft)
- Population (2021-12-01): 2,404
  - Density: 105.9/km^{2} (274.2/sq mi)
- Time zone: UTC+02:00 (EET)
  - Summer (DST): UTC+03:00 (EEST)
- Postal code: 137285
- Area code: +(40) 245
- Vehicle reg.: DB
- Website: malucuflori.ro

Malu cu Flori is a commune in Dâmbovița County, Muntenia, Romania with a population of 2,484 people as of 2021. It is composed of five villages: Capu Coastei, Copăceni, Malu cu Flori, Micloșanii Mari, and Micloșanii Mici.

The commune is located in the northwestern part of the county, on the border with Argeș County.

Seven generals of the Romanian Army were born in Malu cu Flori: Mihai Anton, Decebal Ilina, Decebal Constantin Diaconescu, Constantin Emilian Pahonțu, Titus Popescu, Dumitru Nicolae Scarlat, and Ion Șerb.

Historical population
Year	Pop.	±%
2002	2,719	—
2011	2,484	−8.6%
2021	2,404	−3.2%
Source: Census data
