= Frumușani =

- Commune
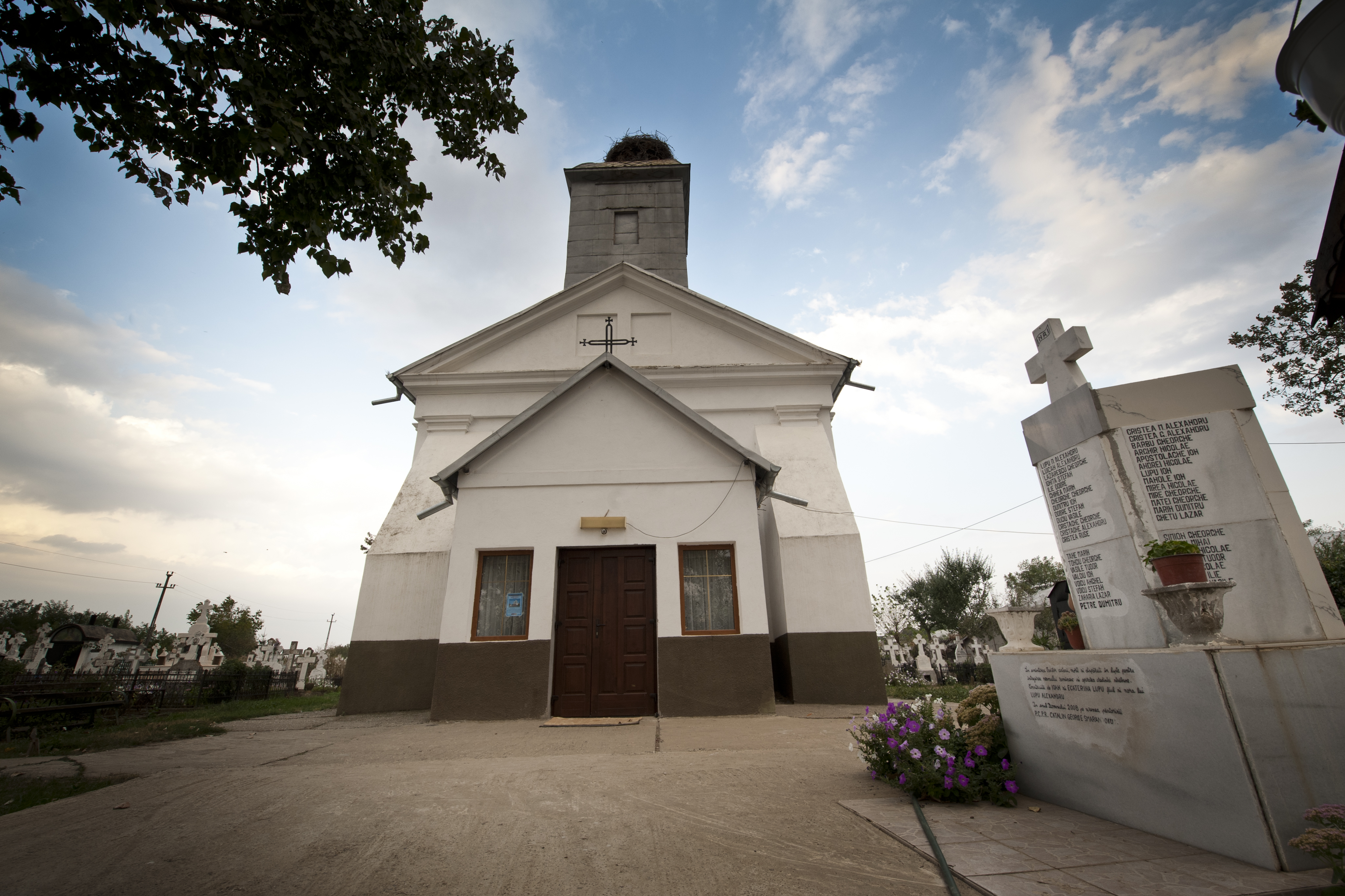
- Church of the Assumption of the Virgin Mary in Pădurișu

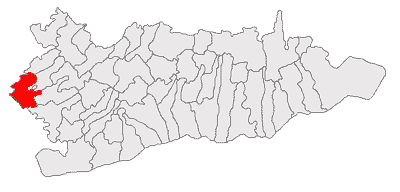
- Location in Călărași County

- Location in Romania
- Coordinates: 44°18′N 26°20′E
- Country: Romania
- County: Călărași

Government
  - Mayor (2024–2028): Costel-Nelu Cristache (PSD)
- Area: 72.92 km^{2} (28.15 sq mi)
- Elevation: 52 m (171 ft)
- Population (2021-12-01): 6,124
  - Density: 83.98/km^{2} (217.5/sq mi)
- Time zone: UTC+02:00 (EET)
  - Summer (DST): UTC+03:00 (EEST)
- Postal code: 917100
- Area code: +(40) 242
- Vehicle reg.: CL
- Website: www.primaria-frumusani.ro

Frumușani is a commune in Călărași County, Muntenia, România. It is composed of six villages: Frumușani, Orăști, Pasărea, Pădurișu, Pițigaia, and Postăvari.

The commune is located at the western extremity of the county, in the proximity of Bucharest, 15 km (9.3 mi) to the southeast on the national road to Oltenița (DN4), just after Popești-Leordeni. The access is quite easy, because of a good quality national road and the Bucharest belt nearby and the traffic is not crowded. The landscape is quite picturesque, thanks to an imposing forest and lakes.

In the past, the zone was not as developed as the neighboring villages within the same area and comparable distance from Bucharest (Glina, Brănești, Berceni, Jilava), due to its belonging to Călărași County, quite a poor one. Lately important investments appeared in this area. Tnuva milk factory started its activity in 2006 and several real-estate residences are in the process of being developed (Allegria).

Historical population
| Year | Pop. | ±% |
|---|---|---|
| 2002 | 5,179 | — |
| 2011 | 5,859 | +13.1% |
| 2021 | 6,124 | +4.5% |
Source: Census data
