= Nucet, Dâmbovița =

Nucet
- Commune
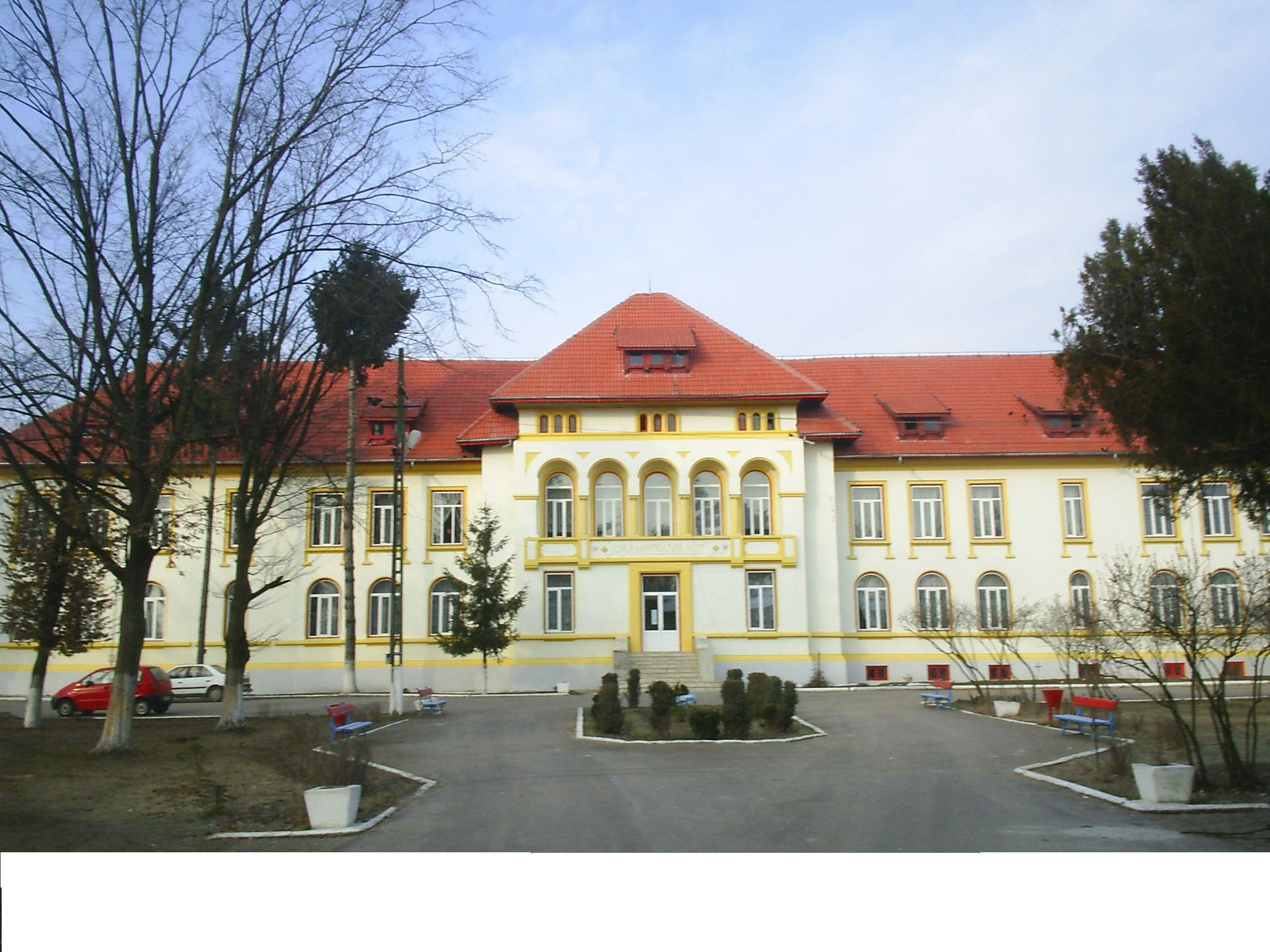
- Nucet High School

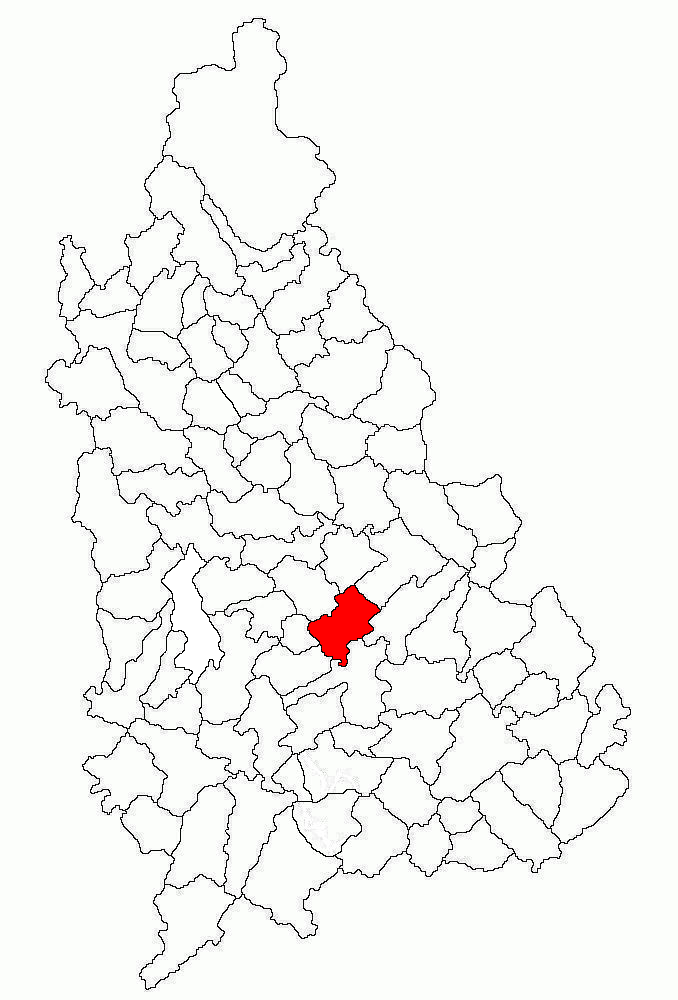
- Location in Dâmbovița County

- Location in Romania
- Coordinates: 44°48′N 25°33′E
- Country: Romania
- County: Dâmbovița

Government
  - Mayor (2020–2024): Luisa Marioara Bărboiu (PSD)
- Area: 39.62 km^{2} (15.30 sq mi)
- Elevation: 202 m (663 ft)
- Population (2021-12-01): 3,995
  - Density: 100.8/km^{2} (261.2/sq mi)
- Time zone: UTC+02:00 (EET)
  - Summer (DST): UTC+03:00 (EEST)
- Postal code: 137335
- Area code: +(40) 245
- Vehicle reg.: DB
- Website: www.comunanucet.ro

Nucet is a commune in Dâmbovița County, Muntenia, Romania with a population of 3,995 people as of 2021. It is composed of three villages: Cazaci, Ilfoveni, and Nucet.

The commune is located in the south-central part of Dâmbovița County, 20 km (12 mi) south of the county seat, Târgoviște, on the banks of the Dâmbovița River. It is traversed by national road DN71, which runs from Târgoviște to Bucharest, some 65 km (40 mi) to the southeast.

Historical population
Year	Pop.	±%
2002	4,404	—
2011	4,057	−7.9%
2021	3,995	−1.5%
Source: Census data

== Natives ==
- Mihai Antonescu (1904–1946), politician who served as Deputy Prime Minister and Foreign Minister during World War II, executed afterwards as a war criminal.
- Rodica Stănoiu (1939–2025), jurist and politician who served as Minister of Justice from 2000 to 2004.
