= Mănăstirea =

Mănăstirea may refer to several places in Romania:

- Mânăstirea, a commune in Călărași County
- Mănăstirea, a village in Pătârlagele town, Buzău County
- Mănăstirea, a village in Mica Commune, Cluj County
- Mănăstirea, a village in Cobia Commune, Dâmbovița County
- Mănăstirea, a village in Crevedia Commune, Dâmbovița County
- Mănăstirea, a village in Dagâța Commune, Iaşi County
- Mănăstirea, a village in Giulești Commune, Maramureș County
- Mănăstirea, a village in Delești Commune, Vaslui County
- Mănăstirea Cașin, a commune in Bacău County
- Mănăstirea Humorului, a commune in Suceava County
- Mănăstirea (Bârlad), a tributary of the Gârboveta in Iași County
- Mănăstirea (Râul Târgului), a tributary of the Râul Târgului in Argeș County

Mănăstire or Mânăstire also means cloister or abbey in Romanian, so every such place in Romania will be preceded by this word.

== See also ==
- Mănăstire (disambiguation)
