= Balabani =

Balabani may refer to:

- Balabani, in Boteni, Argeș County, Romania
- Balabani, in Mociu, Cluj County, Romania
- Balabani, in Conţeşti, Dâmboviţa County, Romania
- Balabani, in Sineşti, Ialomiţa County, Romania
- Balabani, Montenegro
