= Gârboveta =

- Location within Romania

Location
- Country: Romania
- Counties: Iași, Vaslui
- Villages: Dagâța, Tansa

Physical characteristics
- Mouth: Bârlad
  - location: Armășeni
  - coordinates: 46.8345°N 27.2564°E
- Length: 23 km (14 mi)
- Basin size: 201 km^{2} (78 sq mi)

Basin features
- Progression: Bârlad→ Siret→ Danube→ Black Sea
- Tributaries
  - left: Mănăstirea
  - right: Fundătura

The Gârboveta is a left tributary of the river Bârlad in Romania. It discharges into the Bârlad in Armășeni. Its length is 12 km (7.5 mi) and its basin size 38 km^{2} (15 sq mi).
