= Belciugatele (disambiguation) =

Belciugatele may refer to:

- Belciugatele, a commune in Călărași County, Romania
- Belciugatele (river), a tributary of the river Mostiștea in Romania

== See also ==
- Belciug (disambiguation)
- Belciugele, a village in Romania
