= Corâta =

- Location within Romania

Location
- Country: Romania
- Counties: Călărași County
- Villages: Solacolu, Sătucu

Physical characteristics
- Mouth: Mostiștea
  - coordinates: 44.3858°N 26.6517°E
- Length: 12 km (7.5 mi)
- Basin size: 89 km^{2} (34 sq mi)

Basin features
- Progression: Mostiștea→ Danube→ Black Sea

The Corâta is a right tributary of the river Mostiștea in Romania. It flows into the Mostiștea near Codreni. Its length is 12 km (7.5 mi) and its basin size is 89 km^{2} (34 sq mi).
