= Chicerea =

Chicerea may refer to several villages in Romania:

- Chicerea, a village in Motoșeni Commune, Bacău County
- Chicerea, a village in Tomești Commune, Iași County
- Chicerea, a village in Stănița Commune, Neamț County
