= Vânăta =

- Location within Romania

Location
- Country: Romania
- Counties: Ialomița, Călărași
- Villages: Răzoarele, Ileana, Podari, Sărulești-Gară, Fântâna Doamnei, Siliștea

Physical characteristics
- Mouth: Mostiștea
  - location: Lake Frăsinet
  - coordinates: 44.3663°N 26.7427°E
- Length: 37 km (23 mi)
- Basin size: 488 km^{2} (188 sq mi)

Basin features
- Progression: Mostiștea→ Danube→ Black Sea
- Tributaries
  - left: Valea lui Ilie, Suliman, Milotina
  - right: Banciu, Ghiula

The Vânăta is a left tributary of the river Mostiștea in Romania. It flows into the Mostiștea in Siliștea. Its length is 37 km (23 mi) and its basin size is 488 km^{2} (188 sq mi).
