= Mostiștea =

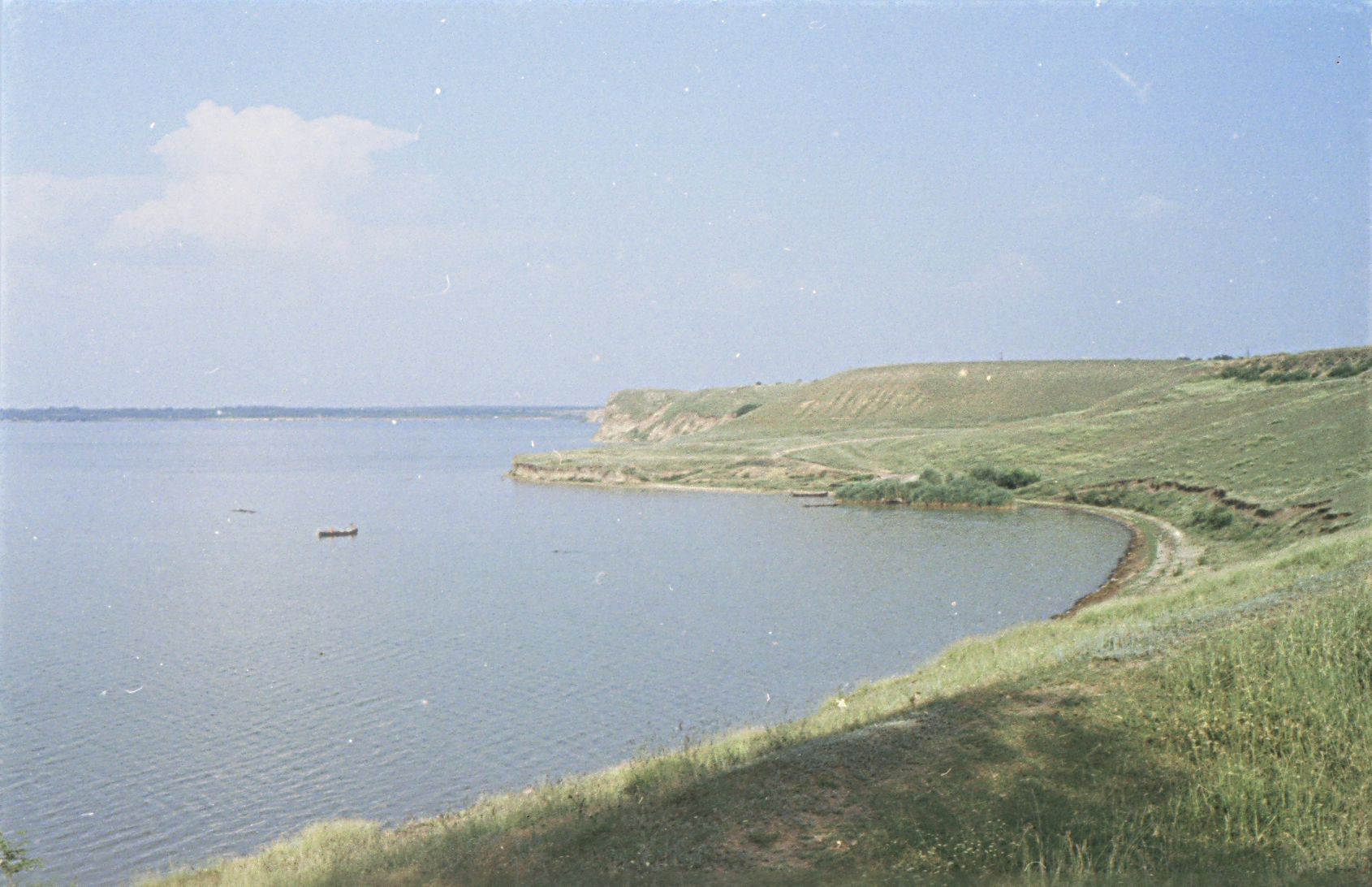
- Lake Mostiștea, seen from the west

- Location within Romania

Location
- Country: Romania
- Counties: Ilfov, Ialomița, Călărași

Physical characteristics
- Mouth: Danube
  - location: near Mânăstirea
  - coordinates: 44°8′30″N 26°58′25″E
  - elevation: 10 m (33 ft)
- Length: 98 km (61 mi)
- Basin size: 1,758 km^{2} (679 sq mi)

Basin features
- Progression: Danube→ Black Sea

The Mostiștea is a left tributary of the river Danube in Romania. It flows through the artificial Lake Mostiștea. Its source is near the village Dascălu, northeast of Bucharest. It flows into the Danube near Mânăstirea. Its length is 98 km (61 mi) and its basin size is 1,758 km^{2} (679 sq mi).

The river (and its tributaries) is formed mainly by lakes (bălți in Romanian), because of human intervention, that flow one into another, until they reach Mânăstirea. There, it forms the largest lake on the river, lake Mostiștea, and it is dammed. After the dam, the river flows towards the Danube artificially channeled, for about 10 km (6 miles), through Canalul Dorobanțu (Dorobanțu Channel).

== Recent ==
The river and its valley have undergone significant anthropogenic changes, particularly in the 20th century. These changes include deforestation for agriculture, drainage of marshes and lakes, and the development of irrigation systems. These modifications to the landscape have significantly impacted the region's archaeological heritage. For instance, the shoreline erosion and the construction of dams have led to the degradation of several archaeological sites. The Mostiștea Valley's landscape has seen a marked increase in artificial surfaces over the years, reflecting changes in land use and economic development

== Towns and villages ==
The following towns and villages are situated along the river Mostiștea, from source to mouth: Dascălu, Petrăchioaia, Sineşti, Belciugatele, Fundulea, Tămădău Mare, Sărulești, Gurbănești, Valea Argovei, Frăsinet, Mânăstirea.

== Tributaries ==
The following rivers are tributaries to the river Mostiștea (from source to mouth):

Left: Valea Livezilor, Colceag, Vânăta, Argova

Right: Belciugatele, Corâta
