= Armășeni =

Armăşeni may refer to several villages in Romania:

- Armăşeni, a village in Ciucsângeorgiu Commune, Harghita County
- Armăşeni, a village in Băcești Commune, Vaslui County
- Armăşeni, a village in Bunești-Averești Commune, Vaslui County
