= Dagâța =

Administrative division of Iași, Romania

- Commune
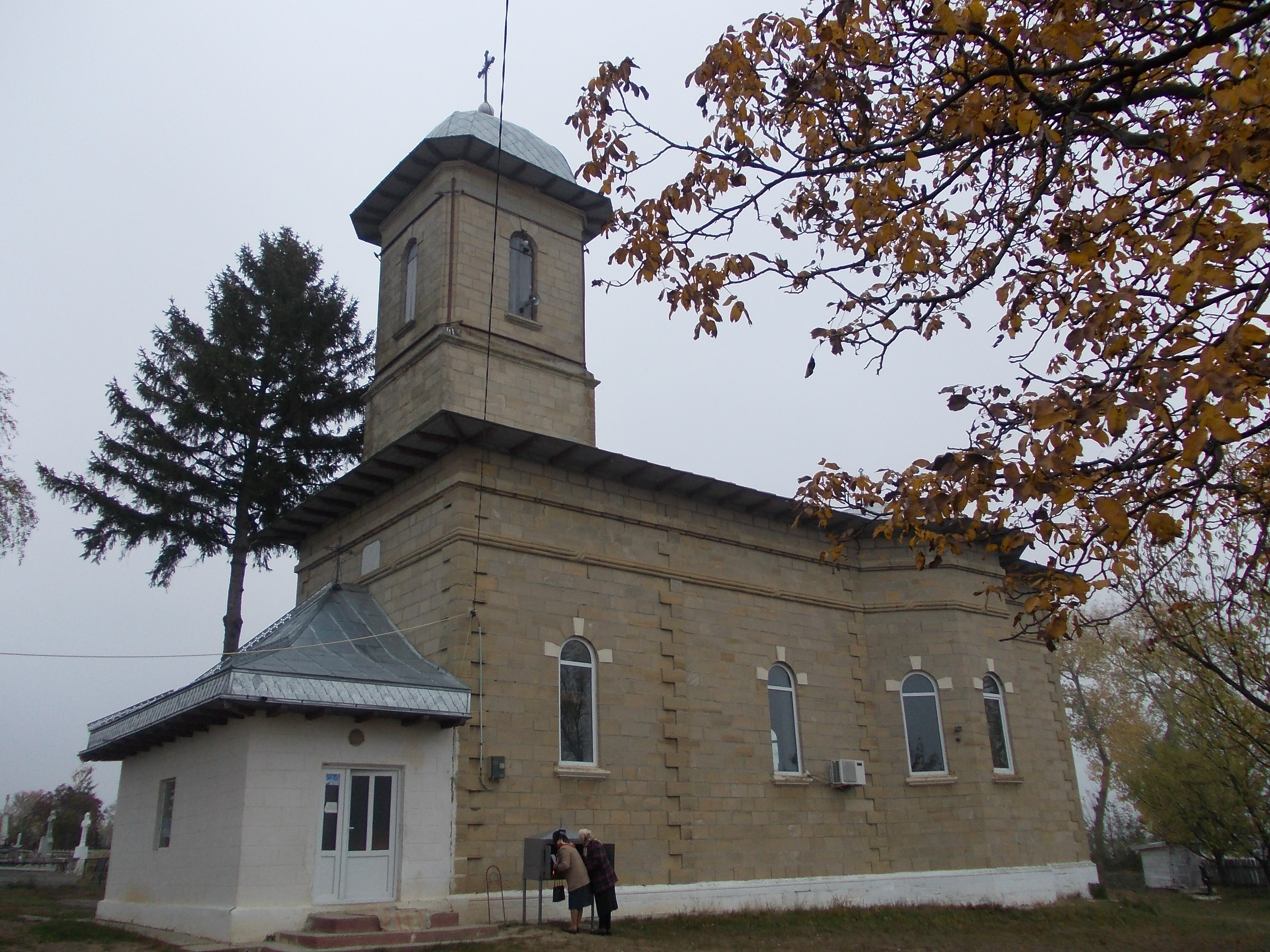
- Church in Dagâța

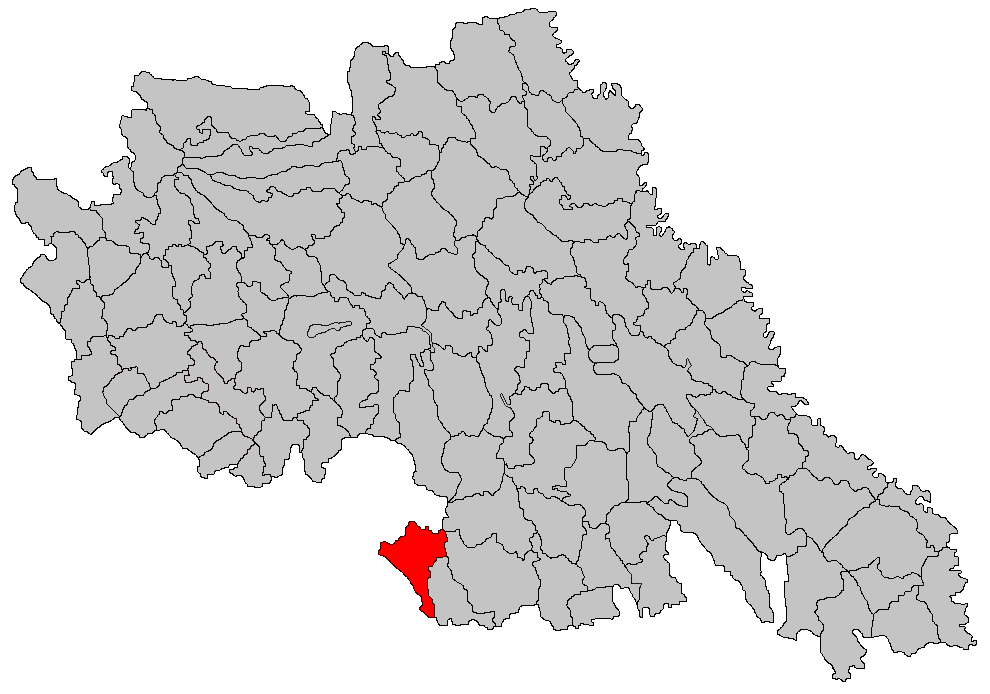
- Location in Iași County

- Location in Romania
- Coordinates: 46°56′N 27°11′E
- Country: Romania
- County: Iași

Government
  - Mayor (2024–2028): Mirel Damaschin (PNL)
- Area: 32.79 km^{2} (12.66 sq mi)
- Elevation: 191 m (627 ft)
- Population (2021-12-01): 4,105
  - Density: 125.2/km^{2} (324.2/sq mi)
- Time zone: UTC+02:00 (EET)
  - Summer (DST): UTC+03:00 (EEST)
- Postal code: 707155
- Area code: (+40) 02 32
- Vehicle reg.: IS
- Website: primariadagata.ro

Dagâța is a commune in Iași County, Western Moldavia, Romania. It is composed of eight villages: Bălușești, Boatca, Buzdug, Dagâța, Mănăstirea, Piscu Rusului, Poienile, Tarnița, and Zece Prăjini.

The commune is located in the southwestern extremity of the county, on the border with Neamț and Vaslui counties. It lies of the banks of the river Gârboveta. Dagâța borders the following communes: Stănița, Neamț to the north; Tansa, Iași to the east; Băcești, Vaslui to the south; and Poienari, Neamț to the west.

The commune is crossed by county roads DJ280 and DJ246. The train station in Dagâța and the halt in Piscu Rusului serve the CFR Line 605, which runs from Roman to Buhăiești.

The Dagâța commune had 4,599 people at the 2011 census; of these, 90.15% were ethnic Romanian and 5.76% were Roma. 93.78% of inhabitants were Romanian Orthodox.

Zece Prăjini ("Ten Fields"), population 400, is the village from which the Roma brass bands Fanfare Ciocărlia and Fanfara Zece Prăjini originate.
