= Mănăstire =

Mănăstire or Mânăstire may refer to:

- Mănăstire, a village in Lupșa Commune, Alba County, Romania
- Mânăstire, a village in Birda Commune, Timiș County, Romania

== See also ==
- Mănăstirea (disambiguation)
- Mânăstirea River (disambiguation)
- Mânăstirea
