= Milotina =

- Location within Romania

Location
- Country: Romania
- Counties: Călărași County
- Villages: Lehliu, Paicu

Physical characteristics
- Mouth: Vânăta
  - coordinates: 44.4075°N 26.7643°E
- Length: 16 km (9.9 mi)
- Basin size: 120 km^{2} (46 sq mi)

Basin features
- Progression: Vânăta→ Mostiștea→ Danube→ Black Sea

The Milotina is a left tributary of the river Vânăta in Romania. It flows into the Vânăta near Fântâna Doamnei. Its length is 16 km (9.9 mi) and its basin size is 120 km^{2} (46 sq mi).
