= Lilieci =

Lilieci may refer to several villages in Romania:

- Lilieci, a village in Hemeiuș Commune, Bacău County
- Lilieci, a village in Sinești Commune, Ialomița County
