= Colceag (river) =

- Location within Romania

Location
- Country: Romania
- Counties: Ilfov, Ialomița, Călărași
- Villages: Movilița, Bițina-Ungureni, Drăgoești

Physical characteristics
- Mouth: Mostiștea
  - coordinates: 44.5387°N 26.4900°E
- Length: 33 km (21 mi)
- Basin size: 211 km^{2} (81 sq mi)

Basin features
- Progression: Mostiștea→ Danube→ Black Sea
- Tributaries
  - left: Valea Bisericii

The Colceag is a left tributary of the river Mostiștea in Romania. It flows into the Mostiștea in Măriuța. Its length is 33 km (21 mi) and its basin size is 211 km^{2} (81 sq mi).
