= Dacian fortress of Mataraua =

- Location within Romania
- 44.495°N 26.425°E
- Periods: Iron Age Europe
- Cultures: La Tène culture
- Location: Mataraua, Călărași, Romania

Site notes
- Condition: Ruined

Monument istoric
- Reference no.: CL-I-s-B-14560

The Dacian fortress of Mataraua was a Dacian fortified town, dating from the La Tène culture.

The ruins of the fortress are located on the right bank of Mostiștea river, across from Mataraua village (a component of Belciugatele commune), in Călărași County, Romania.
