= Movilița, Ialomița =

Movilița
- Commune
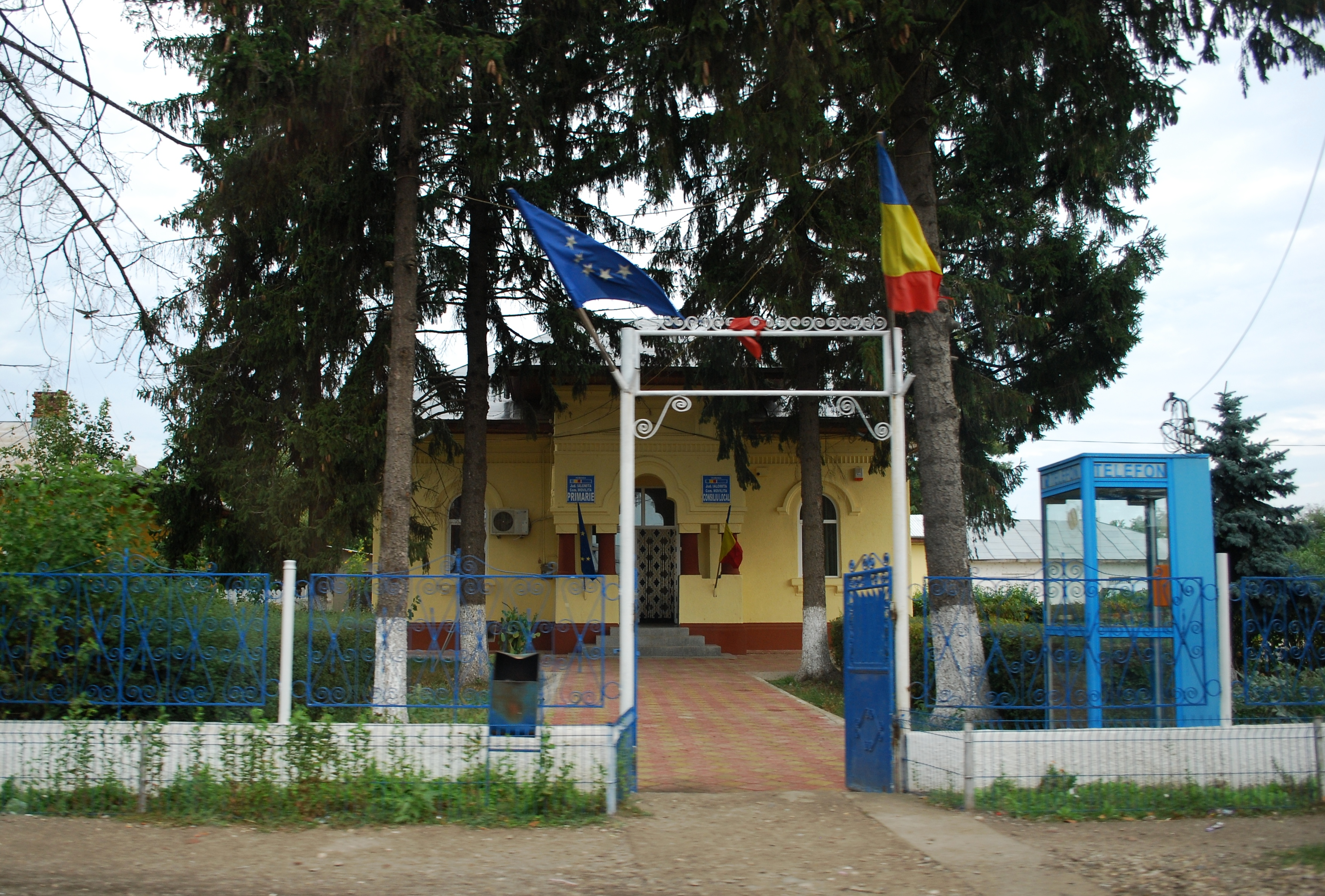
- Movilița town hall

- Location in Ialomița County

- Location in Romania
- Coordinates: 44°38′33″N 26°29′17″E
- Country: Romania
- County: Ialomița

Government
  - Mayor (2020–2024): Ioan Goga (Ind.)
- Area: 28.85 km^{2} (11.14 sq mi)
- Elevation: 66 m (217 ft)
- Population (2021-12-01): 2,810
  - Density: 97.4/km^{2} (252/sq mi)
- Time zone: UTC+02:00 (EET)
  - Summer (DST): UTC+03:00 (EEST)
- Postal code: 927180
- Area code: +(40) 243
- Vehicle reg.: IL
- Website: www.primariamovilita.ro

Movilița is a commune located in Ialomița County, Muntenia, Romania. It is composed of three villages: Bițina-Pământeni, Bițina-Ungureni, and Movilița.

The commune is situated in the Wallachian Plain, at an altitude of 66 m (217 ft). It lies on the banks of the river Colceag. Movilița is located in the western part of Ialomița County, 16 km (10 mi) southwest of Urziceni and 78 km (48 mi) west of the county seat, Slobozia. It is crossed by national road DN2 (on this section, part of European routes E60 and E85), which connects it to the national capital, Bucharest, 45 km (28 mi) to the southwest.

Historical population
Year	Pop.	±%
2002	2,614	—
2011	2,759	+5.5%
2021	2,810	+1.8%
Source: Census data
