= Belciug =

Belciug may refer to several villages in Romania:

- Belciug, a village in Drăgăneşti Commune, Prahova County
- Belciug, a village in Necșești Commune, Teleorman County
- Belciugele, a village in Romania

== See also ==
- Belciugatele (disambiguation)
