= Belciugatele (river) =

- Location within Romania

Location
- Country: Romania
- Counties: Ilfov, Călărași
- Localities: Cojești, Belciugatele, Cândeasca, Fundulea

Physical characteristics
- Mouth: Mostiștea
  - coordinates: 44.474°N 26.529°E
- Length: 21 km (13 mi)
- Basin size: 96 km^{2} (37 sq mi)

Basin features
- Progression: Mostiștea→ Danube→ Black Sea

The Belciugatele is a right tributary of the river Mostiștea in Romania. It flows into the Mostiștea in Dârvari. Its length is 21 km (13 mi) and its basin size is 96 km^{2} (37 sq mi).
