= Mănăstirea (Bârlad) =

- Location within Romania

Location
- Country: Romania
- Counties: Iași County
- Villages: Mănăstirea

Physical characteristics
- Mouth: Gârboveta
  - coordinates: 46.9114°N 27.2099°E
- Length: 12 km (7.5 mi)
- Basin size: 41 km^{2} (16 sq mi)

Basin features
- Progression: Gârboveta→ Bârlad→ Siret→ Danube→ Black Sea
- River code: XII.1.78.5.1

The Mănăstirea is a left tributary of the river Gârboveta in Romania. It flows into the Gârboveta in Dagâța. Its length is 12 km (7.5 mi) and its basin size is 41 km^{2} (16 sq mi).
