= Dascălu, Ilfov =

Dascălu
- Commune
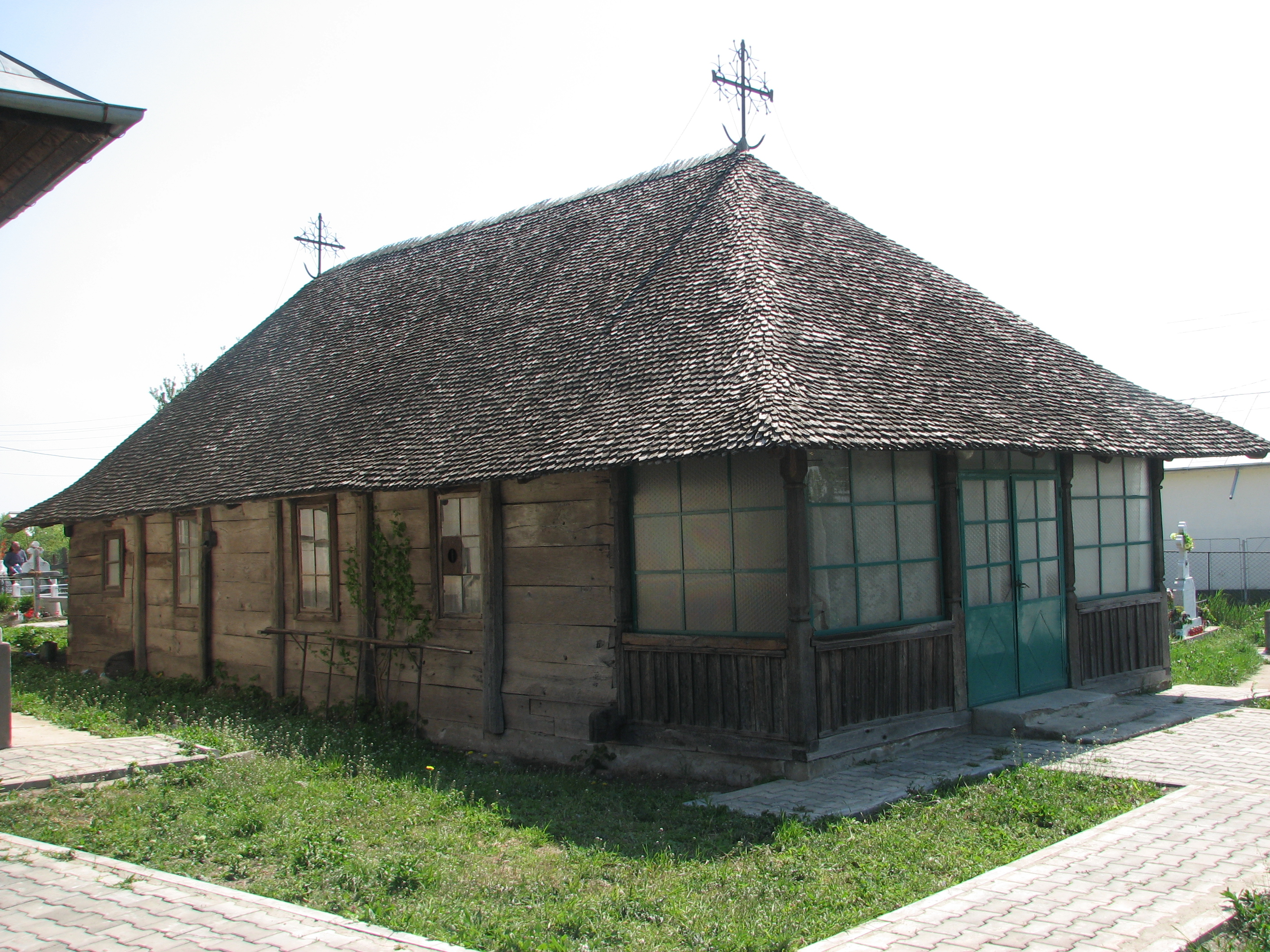
- Wooden church in Gagu

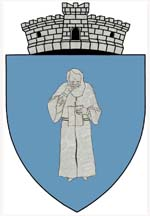
- Coat of arms

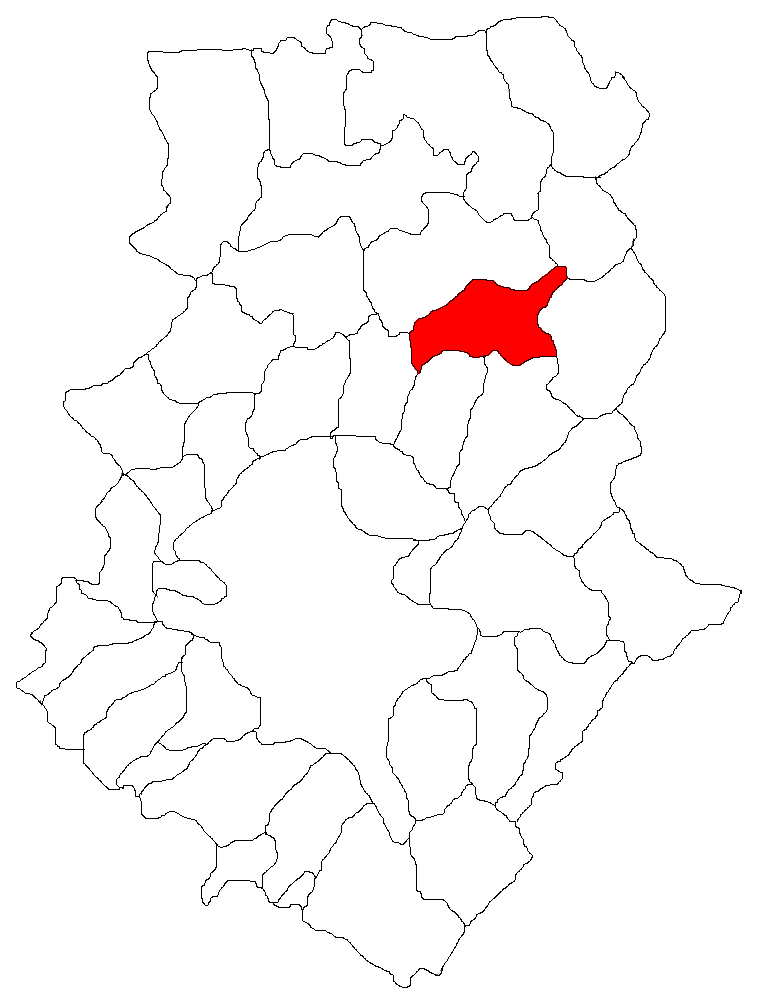
- Location in Ilfov County

- Location in Romania
- Coordinates: 44°36′N 26°14′E
- Country: Romania
- County: Ilfov

Government
  - Mayor (2024–2028): Mugurel Costin Manea (PSD)
- Area: 36 km^{2} (14 sq mi)
- Elevation: 86 m (282 ft)
- Population (2021-12-01): 3,497
  - Density: 97/km^{2} (250/sq mi)
- Time zone: UTC+02:00 (EET)
  - Summer (DST): UTC+03:00 (EEST)
- Postal code: 077075
- Area code: +(40) 21
- Vehicle reg.: IF
- Website: comunadascalu.ro

Dascălu is a commune in Ilfov County, Muntenia, Romania. It is composed of four villages: Creața, Dascălu, Gagu and Runcu. Its name is derived from an obsolete Romanian word for "teacher".

The Mostiștea river has its source in Gagu village.

Historical population
| Year | Pop. | ±% |
|---|---|---|
| 2002 | 2,559 | — |
| 2011 | 3,154 | +23.3% |
| 2021 | 3,497 | +10.9% |
Source: Census data
