= Gheorghe Macovei =

Romanian geologist (1880–1969)

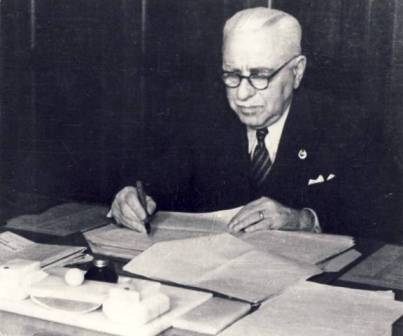
Gheorghe Macovei

Gheorghe Macovei (September 25, 1880 – May 31, 1969) was a Romanian geologist.

== Biography ==
Born in Tansa, Iași County, he attended primary school in his native village, where his father was a teacher. He graduated from the National College in 1899 and from the science faculty of the University of Iași in 1905, where his mentor was Ion Th. Simionescu. He then worked as an assistant in the geology and paleontology laboratory, beginning field studies in Bahna and Broșteni. In 1908, he was an intern at the Vienna Museum of Natural History. He defended a doctoral thesis about the geology of the tertiary basin at Bahna in 1909. Macovei was then hired as assistant geologist at the Romanian Geological Institute in Bucharest, working under Ludovic Mrazek, whom he had come to know while at Broșteni. From 1909 to 1911, he continued to specialize in biostratigraphy at laboratories in Paris, Grenoble, and Lausanne, and on the steppes between the Ural Mountains and the Caspian Sea in 1913. During World War I, he undertook geological studies in the Moldavia region, seeking to provide mineral raw materials for the economy and the populace.

In 1919, he was named professor of geology and paleontology at the mines and metallurgy faculty of the Polytechnic School of Bucharest. While there, he taught courses on general geology, stratigraphy, paleontology and petroleum geology; his research focused on these fields, as well as tectonics and coal. After studying Miocene layers, he shifted toward the Cretaceous, first in Dobruja and then in the eastern Carpathian Mountains. These studies were synthesized in a large 1934 monograph about the Cretaceous in Romania. In 1938, he published a groundbreaking study about the formation of petroleum reserves in Romania; Macovei firmly believed that petroleum was organic in origin. He was director of the geological institute from 1931 to 1960. As such, he discovered and suggested uses for several deposits of minerals useful to the national economy.

Elected a corresponding member of the Romanian Academy in 1931, Macovei was elevated to titular status in 1939. In 1961, the Communist regime awarded him the Order of the Star of the Romanian Socialist Republic, first class.
