= Balabani, Montenegro =

Balabani Балабани
- Village
- Location within Montenegro
- Country: Montenegro
- Municipality: Podgorica

Population (2011)
  - Total: 1,014
- Time zone: UTC+1 (CET)
  - Summer (DST): UTC+2 (CEST)

Balabani (Serbian Cyrillic: Балабани) is a village in the new Zeta Municipality of Montenegro. Until 2022, it was part of Podgorica Municipality.

== Demographics ==
According to the 2011 census, its population was 1,014.

Ethnicity in 2011
| Ethnicity | Number | Percentage |
|---|---|---|
| Montenegrins | 530 | 52.3% |
| Serbs | 352 | 34.7% |
| other/undeclared | 132 | 13.0% |
| Total | 1,014 | 100% |
