= Tansa, Iași =

Tansa
- Commune
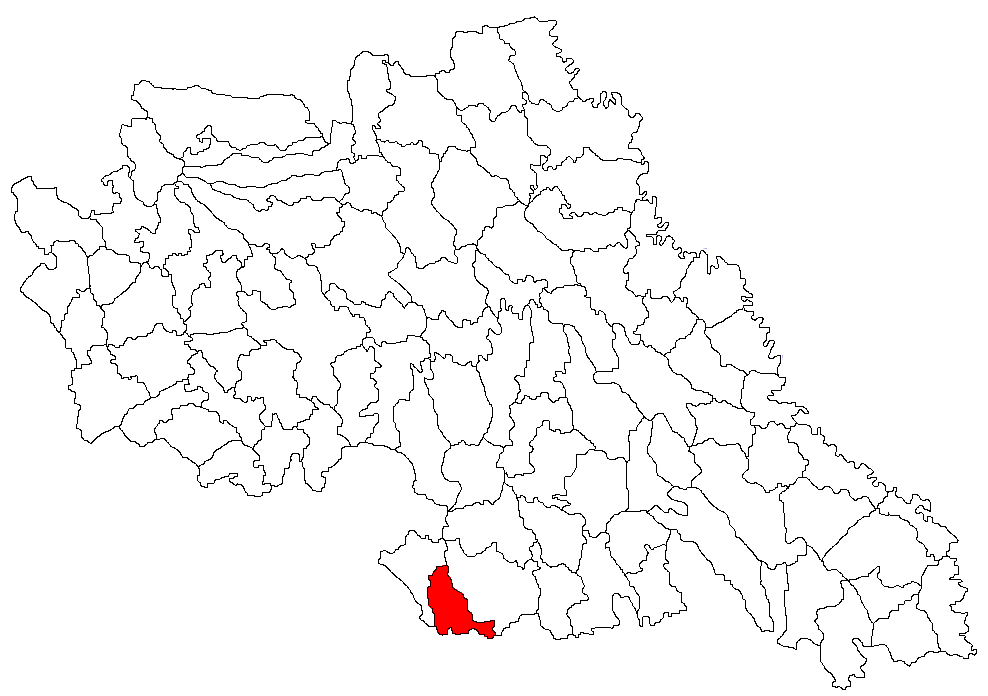
- Location in Iași County

- Location in Romania
- Coordinates: 46°55′N 27°14′E
- Country: Romania
- County: Iași

Government
  - Mayor (2020–2024): Daniel Voinescu (PNL)
- Area: 35.6 km^{2} (13.7 sq mi)
- Elevation: 325 m (1,066 ft)
- Population (2021-12-01): 2,054
  - Density: 58/km^{2} (150/sq mi)
- Time zone: EET/EEST (UTC+2/+3)
- Postal code: 707495
- Area code: +(40) 232
- Vehicle reg.: IS
- Website: www.primariatansa.ro

Tansa is a commune in Iași County, Western Moldavia, Romania. It is composed of two villages, Suhuleț and Tansa.

== Natives ==
- Gheorghe Macovei (1880–1969), geologist
