= Sinești, Ialomița =

Sinești
- Commune
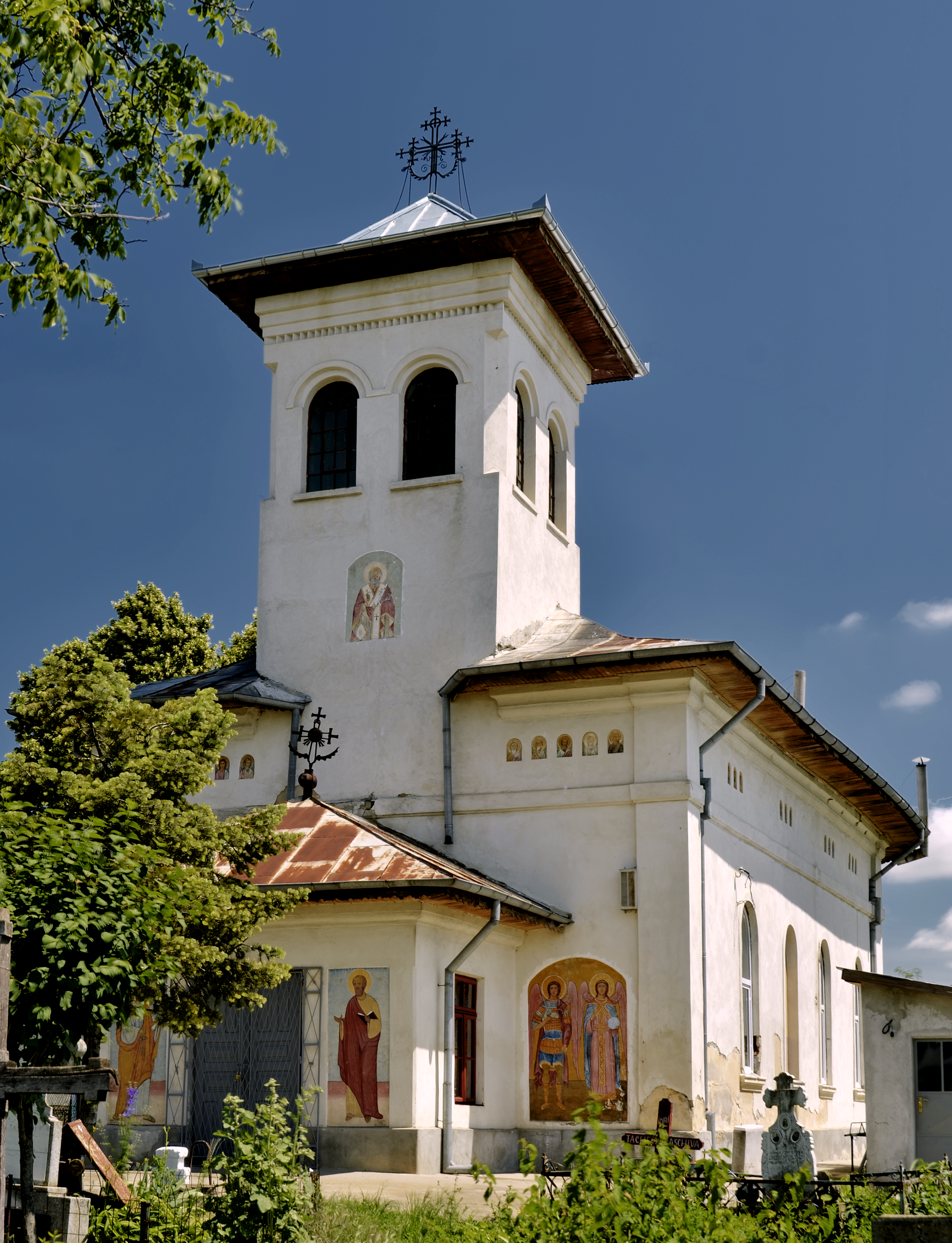
- St. Nicholas Church (1855)

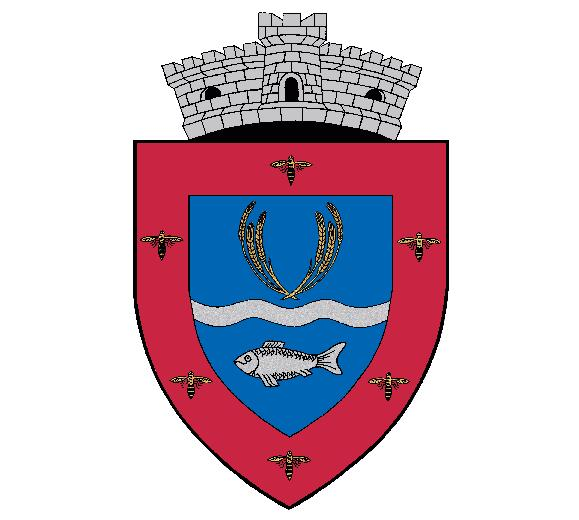
- Coat of arms

- Location in Ialomița County

- Location in Romania
- Coordinates: 44°34′N 26°23′E
- Country: Romania
- County: Ialomița

Government
  - Mayor (2020–2024): Marian Ion (PSD)
- Area: 55.59 km^{2} (21.46 sq mi)
- Population (2021-12-01): 3,372
  - Density: 60.66/km^{2} (157.1/sq mi)
- Time zone: UTC+02:00 (EET)
  - Summer (DST): UTC+03:00 (EEST)
- Postal code: 927220
- Area code: +(40) 243
- Vehicle reg.: IL
- Website: www.primariasinestiil.ro

Sinești is a commune located in Ialomița County, Muntenia, Romania. It is composed of six villages: Boteni, Cătrunești, Hagiești, Lilieci, Livedea, and Sinești.

The commune is situated in the southwestern extremity of the county, on the border with Ilfov County and Călărași County, on the banks of the Mostiștea river. It is crossed by the national road DN2, which connects Bucharest with Urziceni.

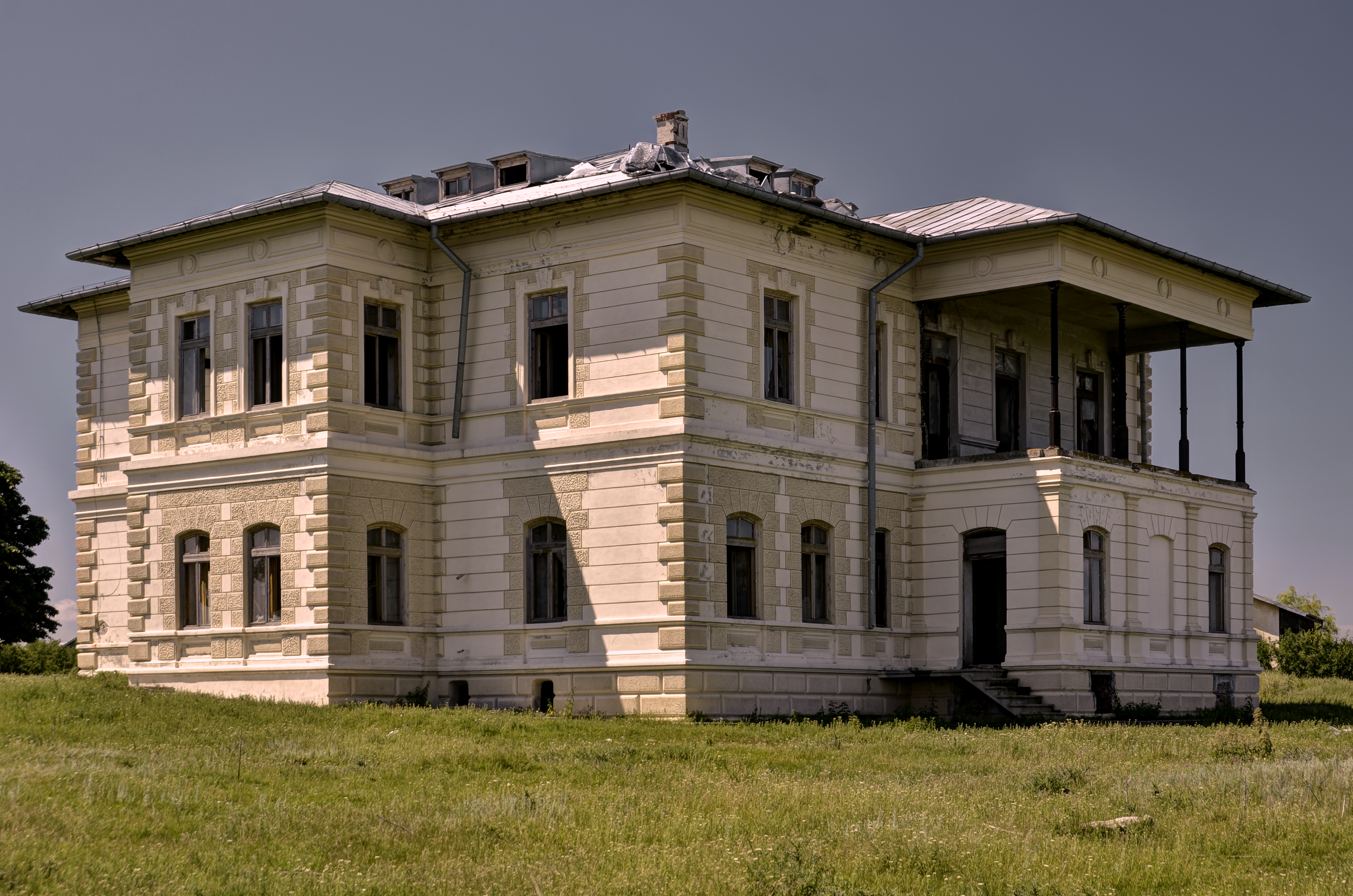
The Marghiloman mansion

Located in Hagiești is a two-story mansion built in 1869–1874 for Alexandru Marghiloman. Although listed as a historical monument, the Marghiloman mansion has become a ruin that serves as a shelter for the sheep herds of nearby shepherds.

Historical population
Year	Pop.	±%
1899	1,382	—
1925	1,704	+23.3%
2002	2,603	+52.8%
2011	2,972	+14.2%
2021	3,372	+13.5%
Source: Census data
