= Stănița =

- Commune
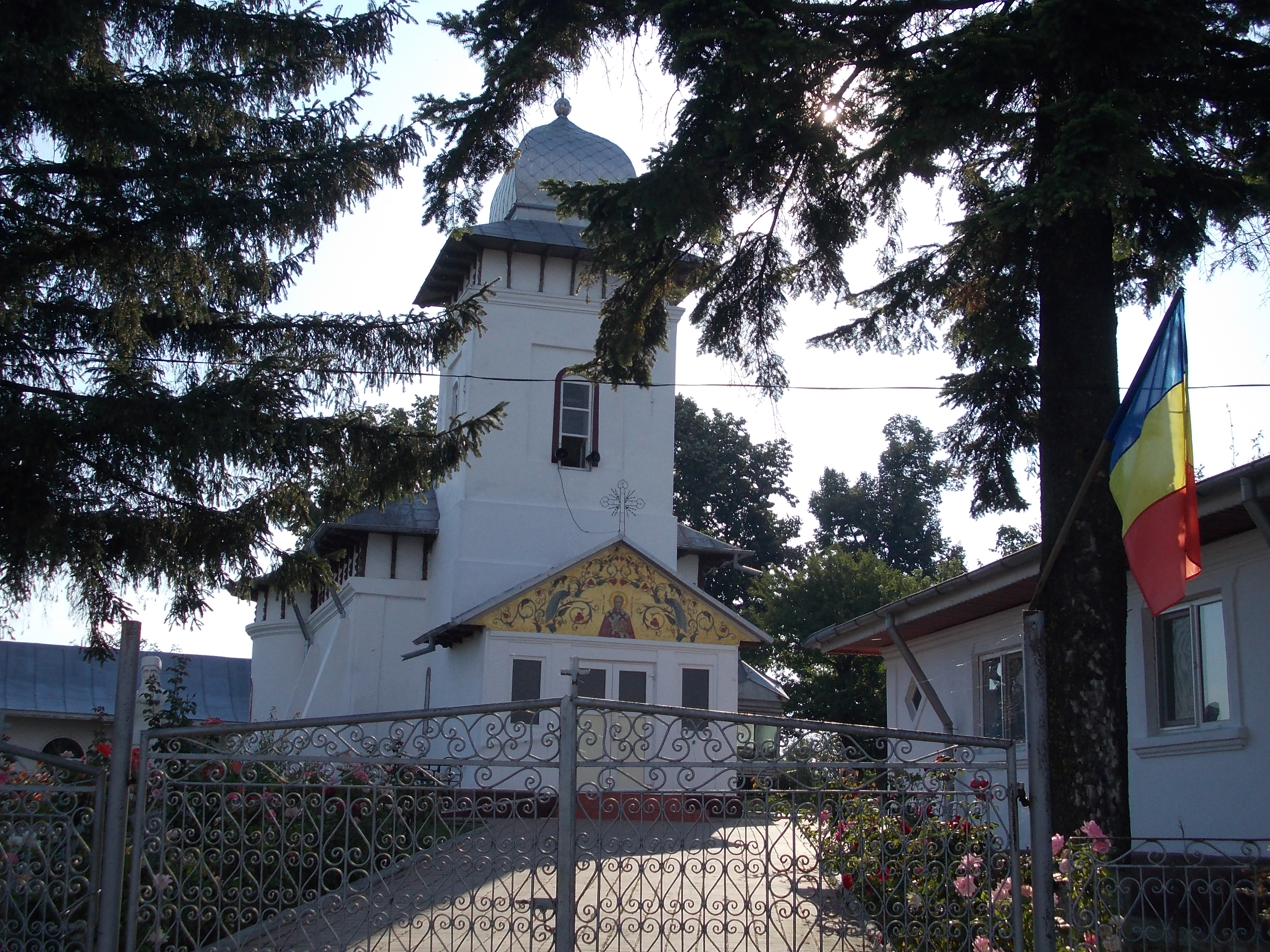
- Church in Stănița

- Location in Neamț County

- Location in Romania
- Coordinates: 47°1′N 27°6′E
- Country: Romania
- County: Neamț

Government
  - Mayor (2020–2024): Laurențiu-Bebi Todireanu (PSD)
- Area: 88 km^{2} (34 sq mi)
- Elevation: 248 m (814 ft)
- Population (2021-12-01): 1,702
  - Density: 19/km^{2} (50/sq mi)
- Time zone: UTC+02:00 (EET)
  - Summer (DST): UTC+03:00 (EEST)
- Postal code: 617425
- Area code: +(40) 233
- Vehicle reg.: NT
- Website: www.comunastanita.ro

Stănița is a commune in Neamț County, Western Moldavia, Romania. It has 1,702 people as of 2021, and is composed of seven villages: Chicerea, Ghidion, Poienile Oancei, Stănița, Todireni, Veja, and Vlădnicele. In turn, Todireni village is made up of three hamlets: Fundu Poienii, Todireni, and Cichirdic.

Historical population
Year	Pop.	±%
1992	2,361	—
2002	2,249	−4.7%
2011	1,966	−12.6%
2021	1,702	−13.4%
Source: Census data
