= Mânăstirea =

- Commune
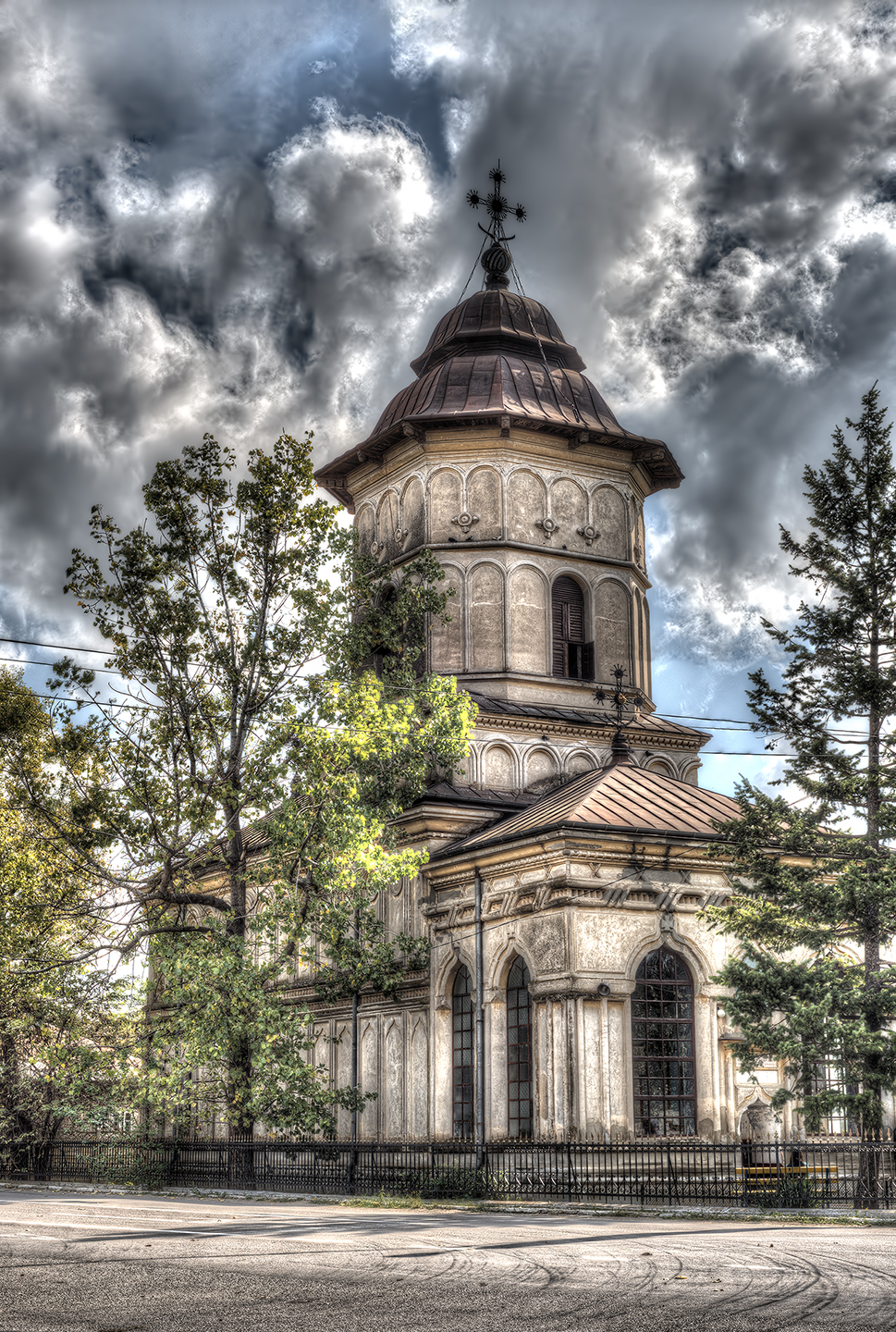
- St. Demetrius and St. Nestor Church

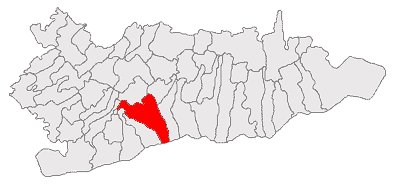
- Location in Călărași County

- Location in Romania
- Coordinates: 44°13′N 26°54′E
- Country: Romania
- County: Călărași

Government
  - Mayor (2024–2028): Marian Mugurel Iancu (PSD)
- Area: 123.54 km^{2} (47.70 sq mi)
- Elevation: 17 m (56 ft)
- Population (2021-12-01): 5,137
  - Density: 41.58/km^{2} (107.7/sq mi)
- Time zone: UTC+02:00 (EET)
  - Summer (DST): UTC+03:00 (EEST)
- Postal code: 917170
- Area code: +(40) 242
- Vehicle reg.: CL

Mânăstirea is a commune in Călărași County, Muntenia, Romania. It is composed of three villages: Coconi, Mânăstirea, and Sultana.

Historical population
Year	Pop.	±%
2002	6,206	—
2011	5,612	−9.6%
2021	5,137	−8.5%
Source: Census data

At the 2011 census, the population of Mânăstirea was 5,612. At the 2021 census, the population had decreased to 5,137.

== Natives ==
- Alexandru Sahia (1908 – 1937), journalist and short storywriter
