= Sărulești, Călărași =

Sărulești
- Commune
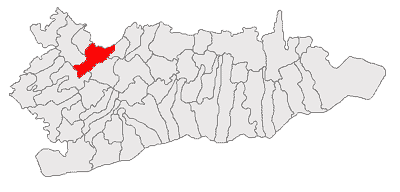
- Location in Călărași County

- Location in Romania
- Coordinates: 44°25′N 26°39′E
- Country: Romania
- County: Călărași

Government
  - Mayor (2024–2028): Petre-Alexandru Călin (PSD)
- Area: 73.86 km^{2} (28.52 sq mi)
- Elevation: 45 m (148 ft)
- Population (2021-12-01): 3,115
  - Density: 42.17/km^{2} (109.2/sq mi)
- Time zone: UTC+02:00 (EET)
  - Summer (DST): UTC+03:00 (EEST)
- Postal code: 917215
- Area code: +(40) 242
- Vehicle reg.: CL
- Website: www.primariacomuneisarulesti.ro

Sărulești is a commune in Călărași County, Muntenia, Romania. It is composed of seven villages: Măgureni, Polcești, Săndulița, Sărulești, Sărulești-Gară, Sătucu, and Solacolu.

Historical population
| Year | Pop. | ±% |
|---|---|---|
| 2002 | 3,177 | — |
| 2011 | 3,262 | +2.7% |
| 2021 | 3,115 | −4.5% |
Source: Census data

At the 2002 census, Sărulești had 3,177 inhabitants. At the 2021 census, the commune had a population of 3,115; of those, 67.51% were Romanians and 22.73% Roma.
