= Băcești =

- Commune
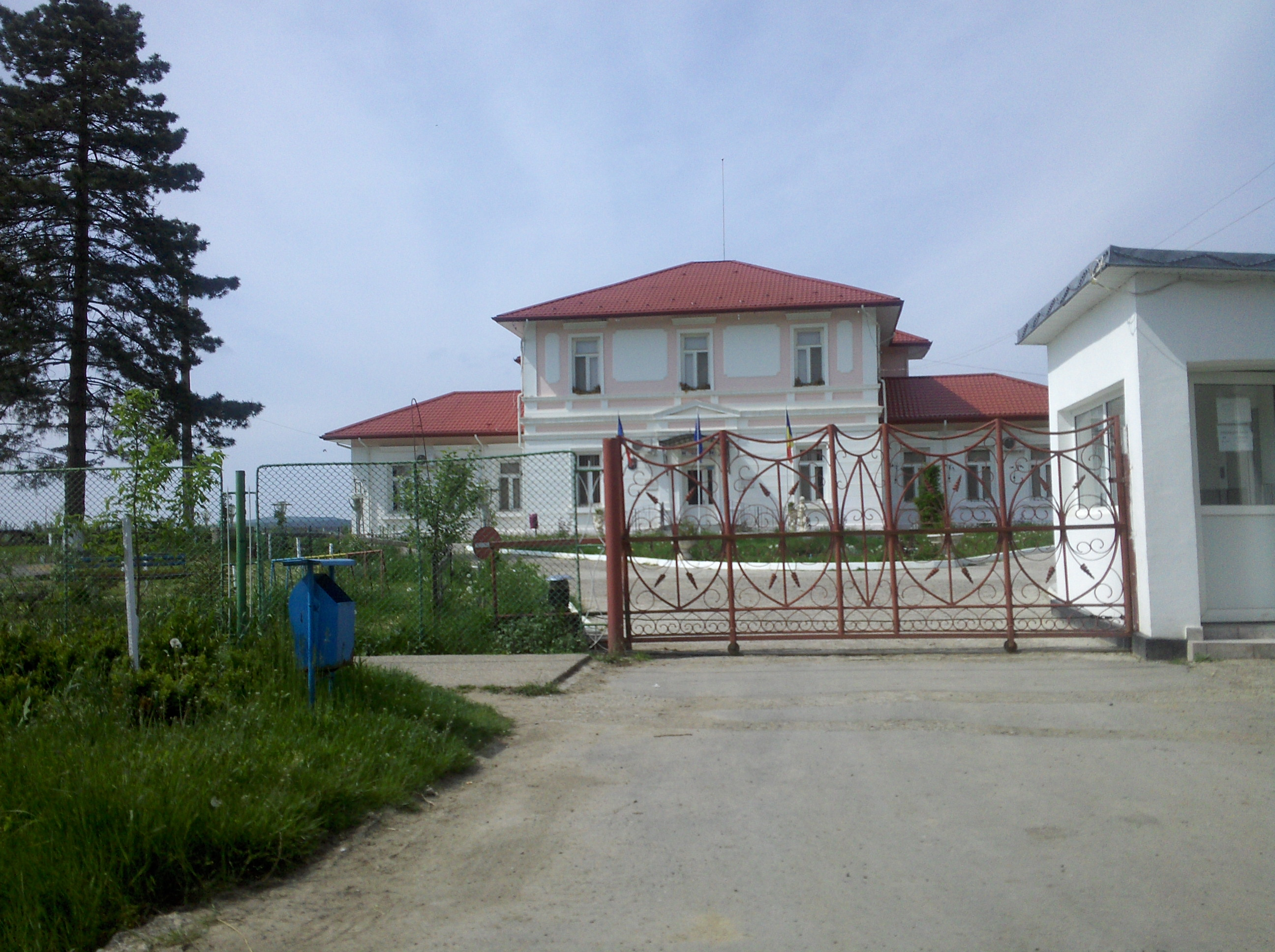
- Health center in Băcești

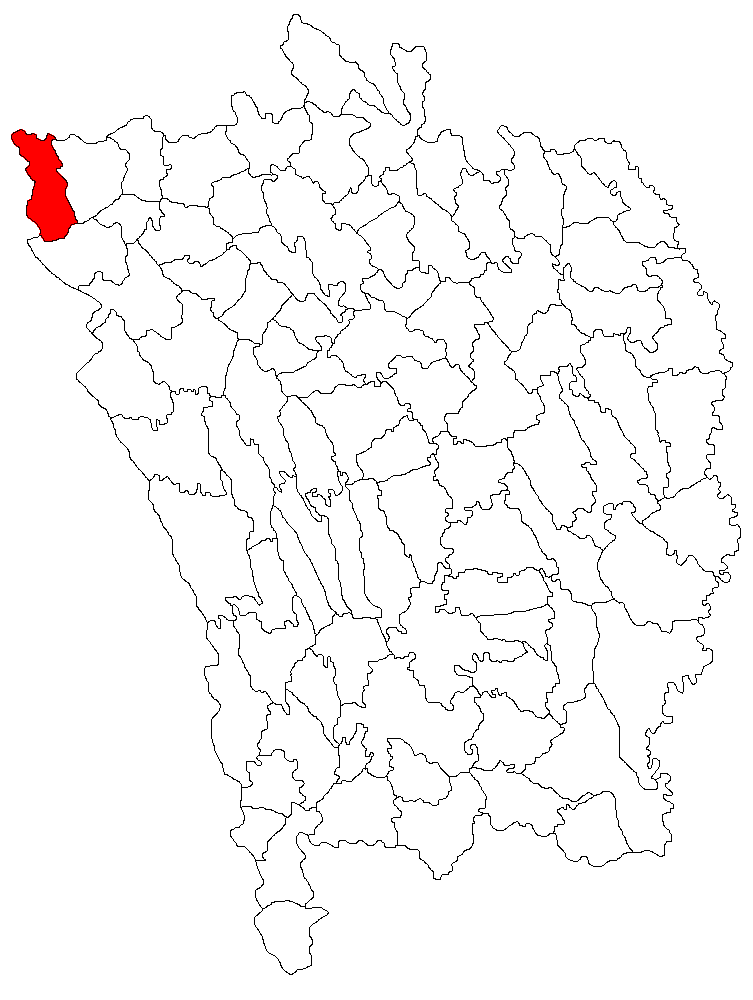
- Location in Vaslui County

- Location in Romania
- Coordinates: 46°51′N 27°14′E
- Country: Romania
- County: Vaslui

Government
  - Mayor (2020–2024): Horațiu Cărăușu (PSD)
- Area: 47.85 km^{2} (18.47 sq mi)
- Elevation: 160 m (520 ft)
- Population (2021-12-01): 4,293
  - Density: 89.72/km^{2} (232.4/sq mi)
- Time zone: UTC+02:00 (EET)
  - Summer (DST): UTC+03:00 (EEST)
- Postal code: 737050
- Area code: +(40) 235
- Vehicle reg.: VS
- Website: www.comunabacesti.ro

Băcești is a commune in Vaslui County, Western Moldavia, Romania. It is composed of six villages: Armășeni, Băcești, Băbușa, Păltiniș, Țibăneștii Buhlii, and Vovriești.

The commune is situated on the Moldavian Plateau, at an altitude of 160 m (520 ft), on the banks of the Bârlad River. It is located in the northwestern extremity Vaslui County, on the border with Bacău County and Iași County. Băcești is crossed by national road DN15D, which connects it to Vaslui, 52 km (32 mi) to the southeast, and to Piatra Neamț, 78 km (48 mi) to the west.
