= Belciugatele =

- Commune
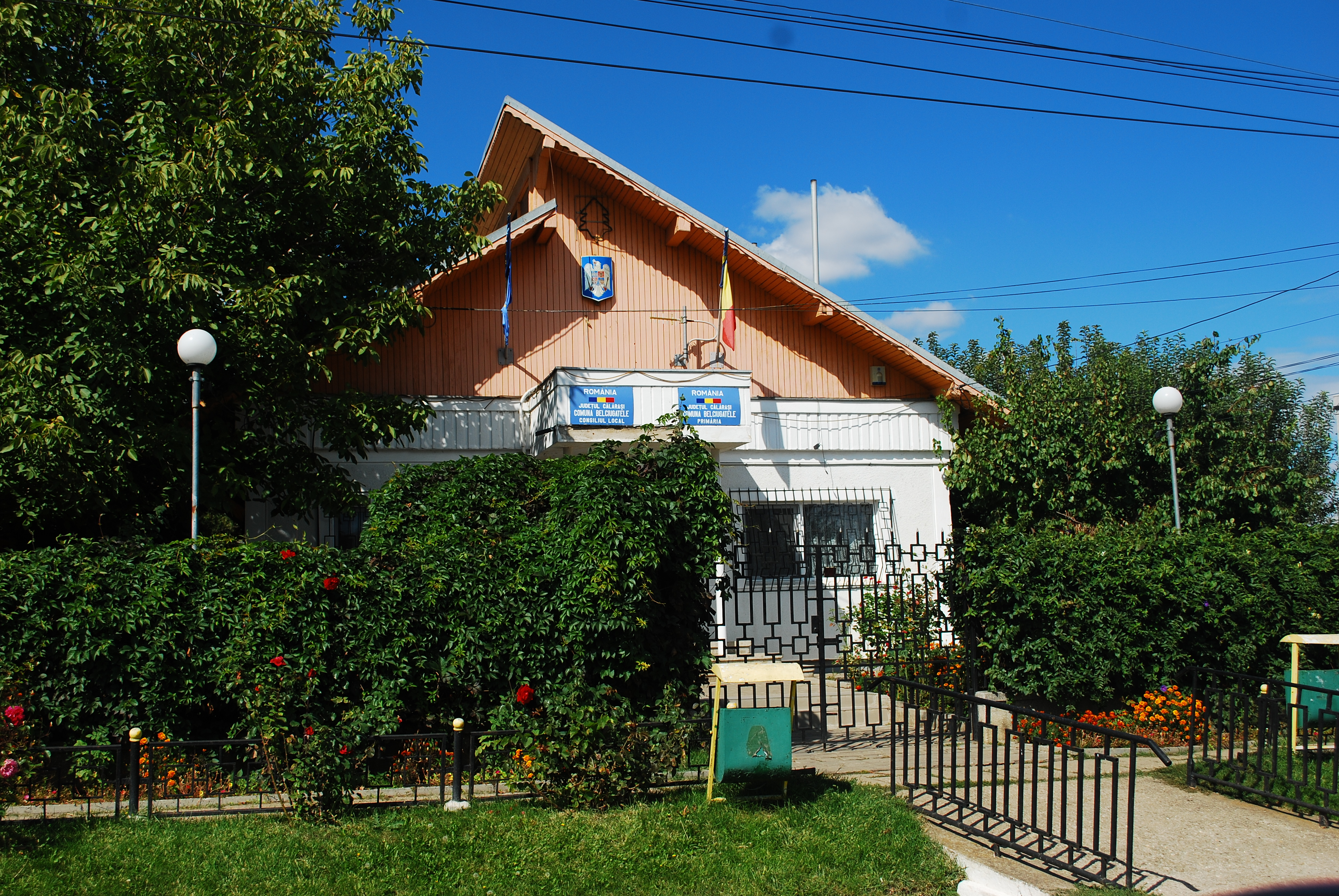
- Belciugatele town hall

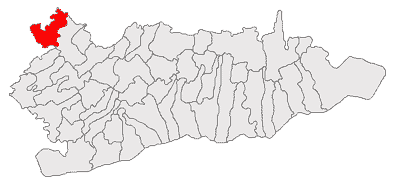
- Location in Călărași County

- Location in Romania
- Coordinates: 44°29′N 26°26′E
- Country: Romania
- County: Călărași

Government
  - Mayor (2024–2028): Ovidiu Iosif Gurlui (PSD)
- Area: 80.14 km^{2} (30.94 sq mi)
- Elevation: 69 m (226 ft)
- Population (2021-12-01): 2,476
  - Density: 30.90/km^{2} (80.02/sq mi)
- Time zone: UTC+02:00 (EET)
  - Summer (DST): UTC+03:00 (EEST)
- Postal code: 917010
- Area code: +40 x42
- Vehicle reg.: CL
- Website: www.belciugatele.ro

Belciugatele is a commune in Călărași County, Muntenia, Romania. It is composed of five villages: Belciugatele, Cândeasca, Cojești, Mataraua, and Măriuța.

Historical population
| Year | Pop. | ±% |
|---|---|---|
| 2002 | 2,353 | — |
| 2011 | 2,484 | +5.6% |
| 2021 | 2,476 | −0.3% |
Source: Census data

At the 2011 census, the population of Belciugatele was 2,484, while at the 2021 census it was 2,476.

The ruins of a Dacian fortress are located in Mataraua.
