= Urlui =

- Location within Romania

Location
- Country: Romania
- Counties: Teleorman County
- Villages: Troianul, Urluiu, Furculești

Physical characteristics
- Mouth: Călmățui
  - coordinates: 43.8486°N 25.1189°E
- Length: 62 km (39 mi)
- Basin size: 289 km^{2} (112 sq mi)

Basin features
- Progression: Călmățui→ Danube→ Black Sea
- Tributaries
  - right: Epureasca, Adâncata

The Urlui is a left tributary of the river Călmățui in Romania. It discharges into the Călmățui near Voievoda. Its length is 62 km (39 mi) and its basin size is 289 km^{2} (112 sq mi).
