= Moșteni (disambiguation) =

Moșteni is a commune in Teleorman County.

Moșteni or Mosteni may also refer to the following places:

== Romania ==
- Moșteni, a village in Ulmi Commune, Giurgiu County
- Moșteni, a village in Schitu Commune, Olt County
- Moșteni, a village in Furculești Commune, Teleorman County
- Moșteni, a village in Frâncești Commune, Vâlcea County

== Elsewhere ==
- Mostene, a town of ancient Lydia now in Turkey

== See also ==
- Trivalea-Moșteni, a commune in Teleorman County
- Cherleștii Moșteni, a village in Teslui Commune, Olt County
- Logrești-Moșteni, a village in Logrești Commune, Teleorman County
- Moșna (disambiguation)
- Moșneni (disambiguation)
