= Conțești =

Conţeşti may refer to several places in Romania:

- Conțești, a commune in Dâmbovița County
- Conțești, a commune in Teleorman County
- Conțești, a village in Davidești Commune, Argeș County
- Conțești, a village in Sascut Commune, Bacău County
- Conțești, a village in Valea Seacă Commune, Iași County
