= Mosna =

Mosna may refer to:

- Mosna, Serbia, a village in the municipality of Majdanpek, in eastern Serbia
- Mosna, Poland, a village in Pomeranian Voivodeship in northern Poland
- Moşna (disambiguation), the name of several places in Romania
- Mosna, a village in Brabova Commune, Dolj County, Romania
- Mosna (surname)
