= Troianul =

- Commune
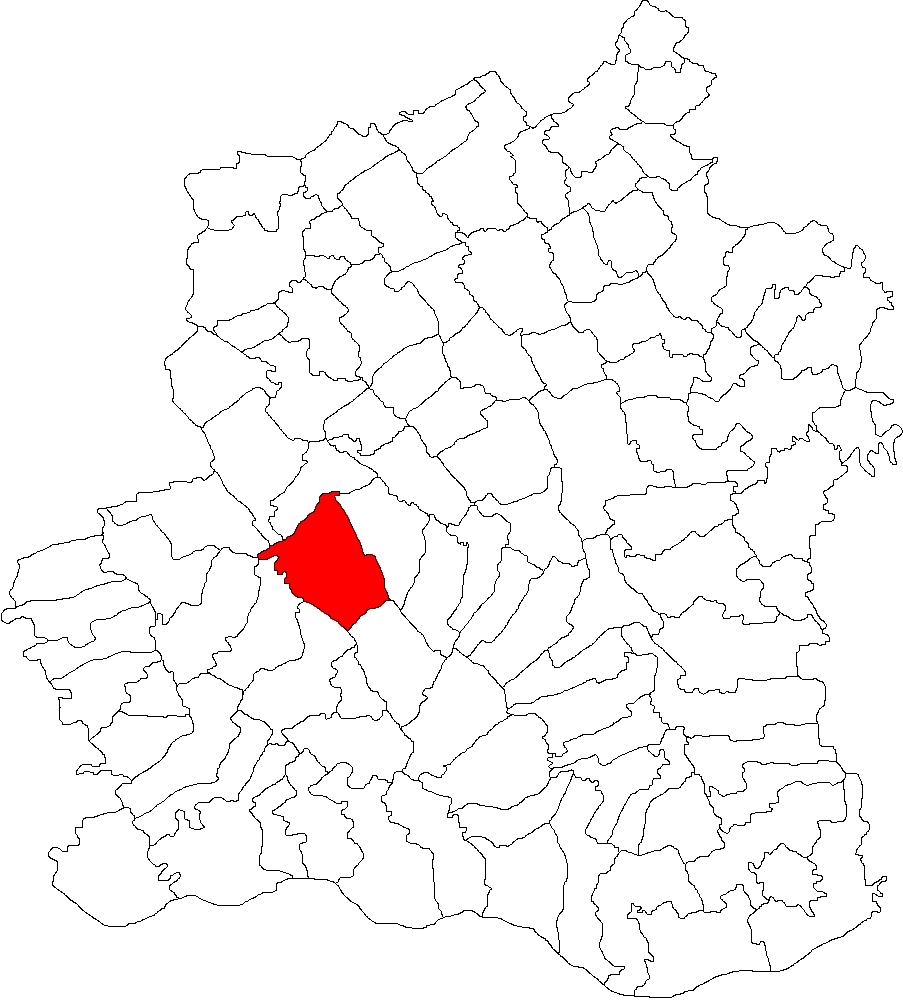
- Location in Teleorman County

- Location in Romania
- Coordinates: 44°0′6″N 25°1′9″E
- Country: Romania
- County: Teleorman
- Subdivisions: Dulceni, Troianul, Vatra

Government
  - Mayor (2020–2024): Ionel Neagu (PNL)
- Area: 68.98 km^{2} (26.63 sq mi)
- Elevation: 89 m (292 ft)
- Population (2021-12-01): 2,424
  - Density: 35/km^{2} (91/sq mi)
- Time zone: EET/EEST (UTC+2/+3)
- Postal code: 147415
- Area code: +(40) x47
- Vehicle reg.: TR
- Website: www.comunatroianul.ro

Troianul is a commune in Teleorman County, Muntenia, Romania. It has three villages: Dulceni, Troianul, and Vatra.

The commune is situated in the Wallachian Plain, at an altitude of 89 m (292 ft), on the banks of the river Urlui. It is located in the west-central part of Teleorman County, 12 km (7.5 mi) south of Roșiorii de Vede and 29 km (18 mi) west of the county seat, Alexandria. Troianul is crossed north to south by the national road DN65E, which connects Roșiorii de Vede with Piatra.

== Natives ==
- Ion C. Pena (1911–1944), writer
