= Ulmeni =

Ulmeni may refer to several places in Romania:

- Ulmeni, a town in Maramureș County
- Ulmeni, a commune in Buzău County
- Ulmeni, a commune in Călăraşi County
- Ulmeni, a village in Bogdana Commune, Teleorman County
