= Brânceni =

- Commune
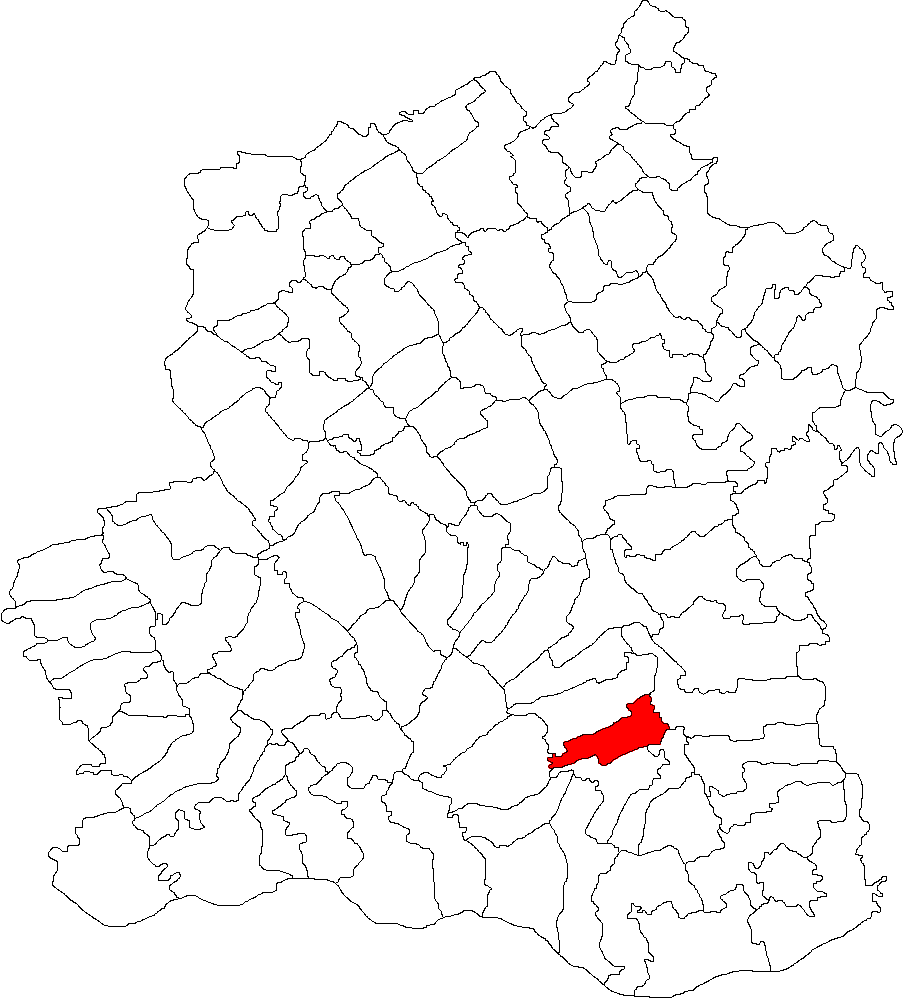
- Location in Teleorman County

- Location in Romania
- Coordinates: 43°53′N 25°24′E
- Country: Romania
- County: Teleorman
- Population (2021-12-01): 2,688
- Time zone: EET/EEST (UTC+2/+3)
- Vehicle reg.: TR

Brânceni (Romanian pronunciation: [brɨnˈt͡ʃenʲ]) is a commune in Teleorman County, Muntenia, Romania. It is composed of a single village, Brânceni.
