= Călmățuiu de Sus =

- Commune
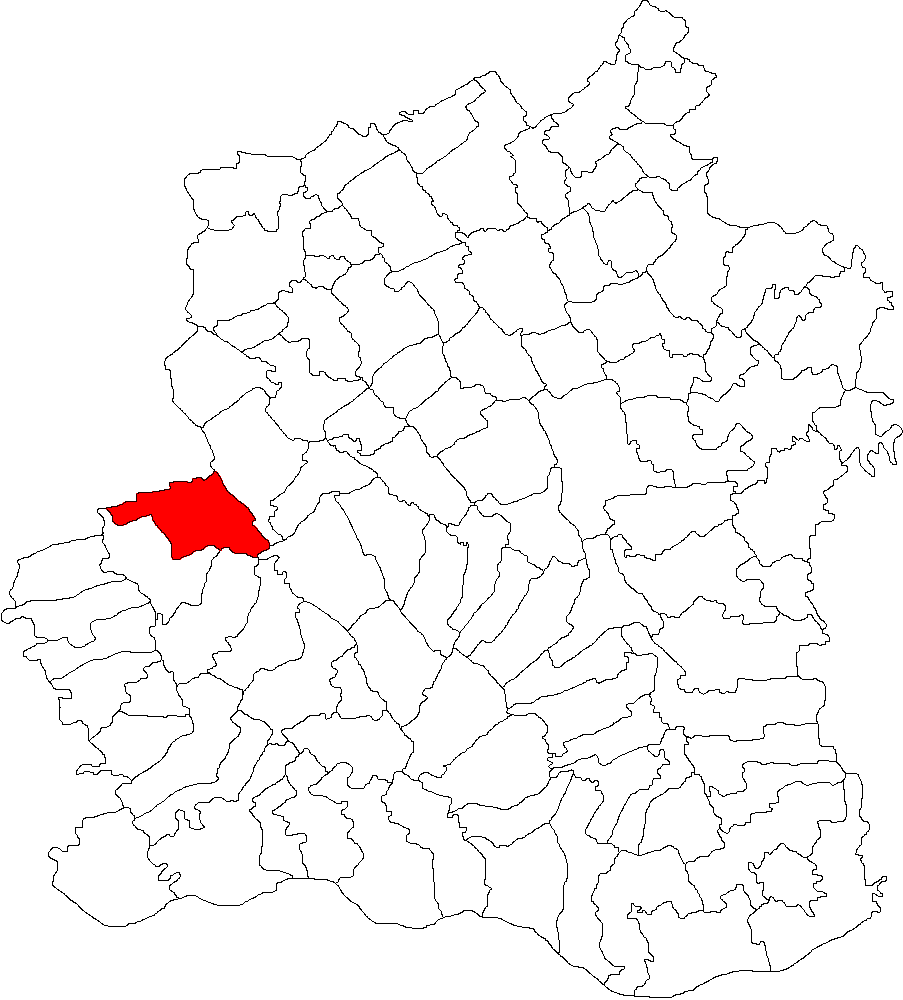
- Location in Teleorman County

- Location in Romania
- Coordinates: 44°02′N 24°49′E
- Country: Romania
- County: Teleorman
- Subdivisions: Băcălești, Călmățuiu de Sus, Ionașcu
- Population (2021-12-01): 1,732
- Time zone: EET/EEST (UTC+2/+3)
- Vehicle reg.: TR

Călmățuiu de Sus (Romanian pronunciation: [kəlməˈt͡suju de sus]; called Băsești (Romanian pronunciation: [bəˈseʃtʲ]) until 1968) is a commune in Teleorman County, Muntenia, Romania. It is composed of three villages: Băcălești, Călmățuiu de Sus and Ionașcu.
