= Ciolănești =

- Commune
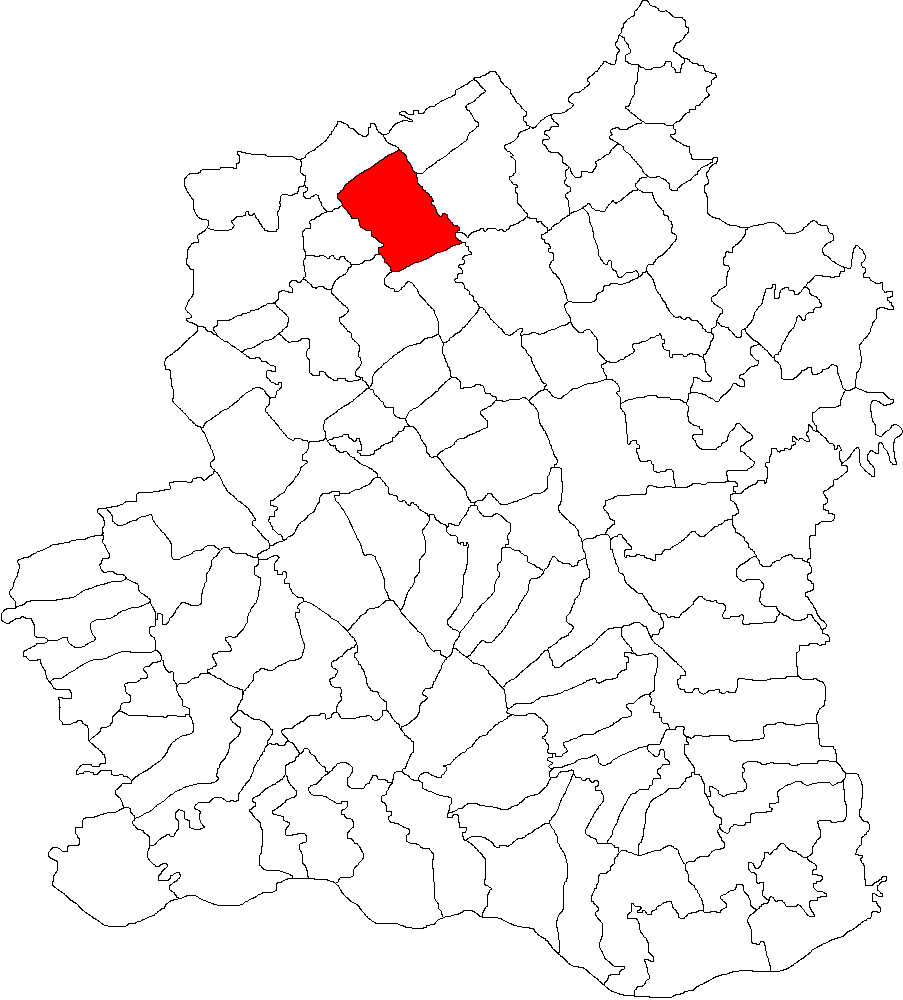
- Location in Teleorman County

- Location in Romania
- Coordinates: 44°19′N 25°05′E
- Country: Romania
- County: Teleorman
- Subdivisions: Baldovinești, Ciolăneștii din Deal, Ciolăneștii din Vale
- Population (2021-12-01): 2,456
- Time zone: EET/EEST (UTC+2/+3)
- Vehicle reg.: TR
- Website: ciolanesti.teleorman.org

Ciolănești (Romanian pronunciation: [t͡ʃjoləˈneʃtʲ]) is a commune in Teleorman County, Muntenia, Romania. It is composed of three villages: Baldovinești, Ciolăneștii din Deal (the commune center) and Ciolăneștii din Vale.
