= Rădoiești =

- Commune
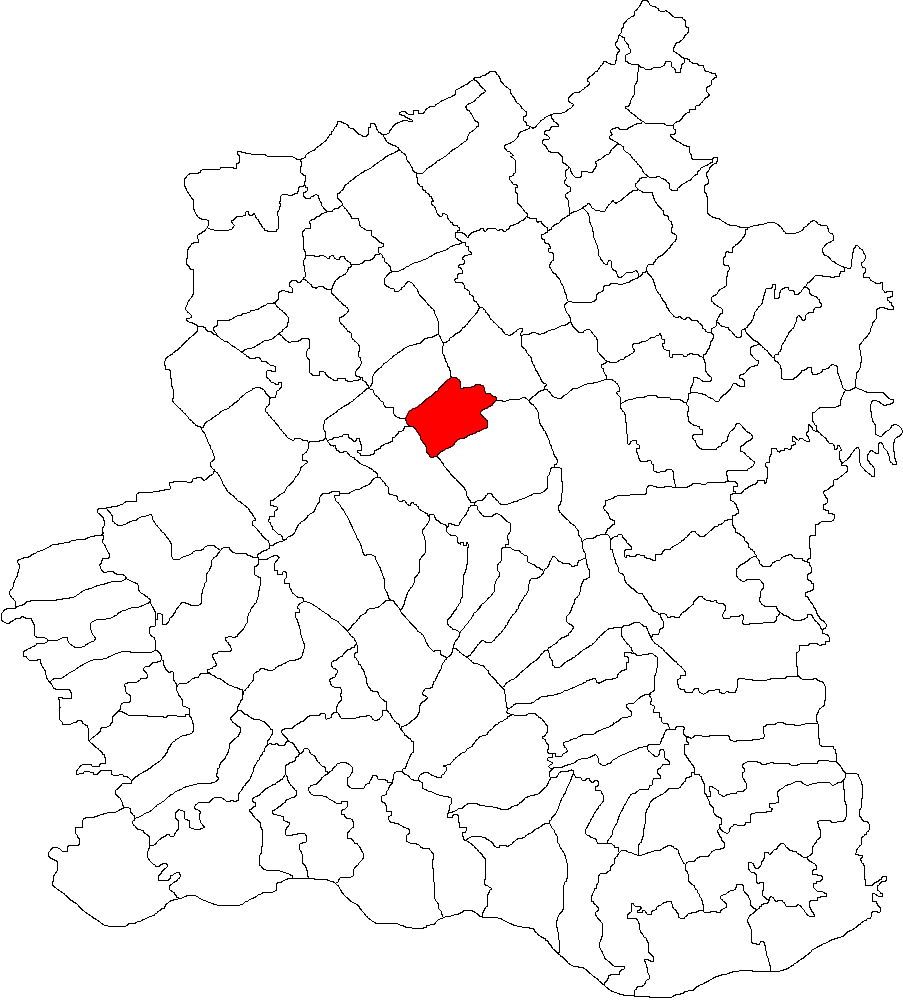
- Location in Teleorman County

- Location in Romania
- Coordinates: 44°9′N 25°9′E
- Country: Romania
- County: Teleorman
- Subdivisions: Cetatea, Rădoiești-Vale, Rădoiești-Deal
- Population (2021-12-01): 2,129
- Time zone: EET/EEST (UTC+2/+3)
- Vehicle reg.: TR

Rădoiești is a commune in Teleorman County, Muntenia, Romania. It is composed of three villages: Cetatea, Rădoiești-Deal and Rădoiești-Vale (the commune center).
