= Ciuperceni, Teleorman =

Ciuperceni
- Commune
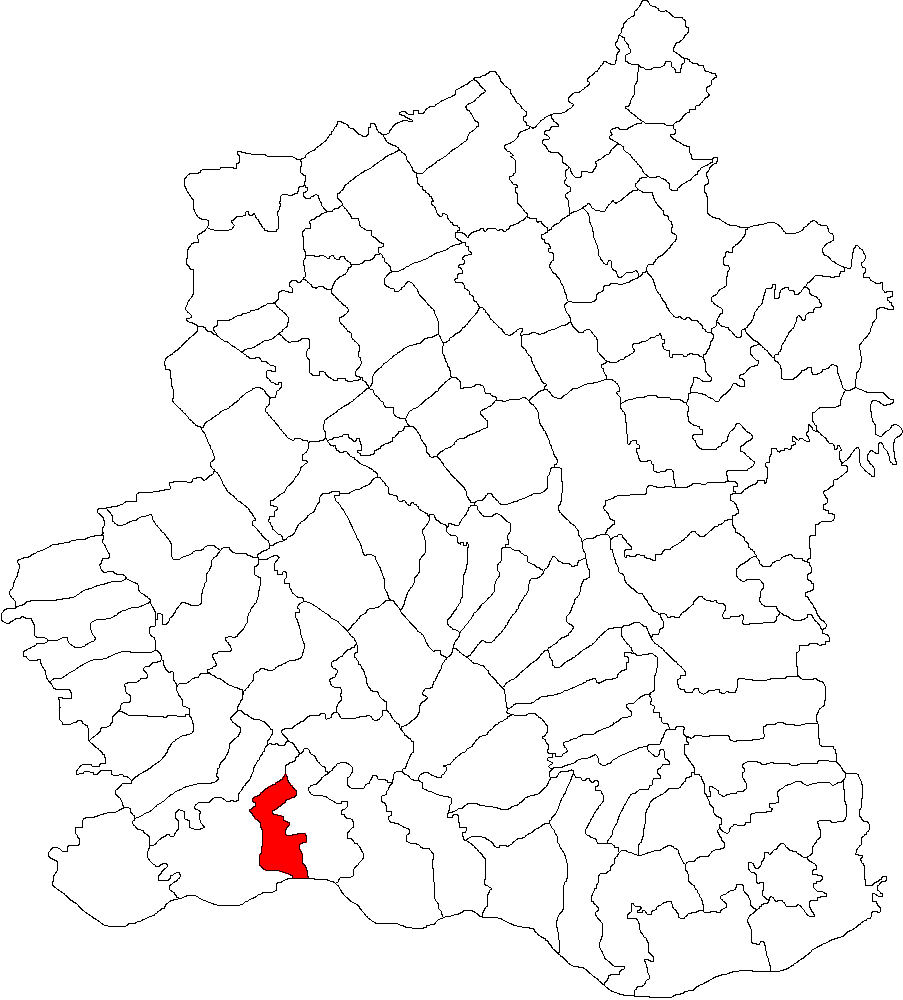
- Location in Teleorman County

- Location in Romania
- Coordinates: 43°46′N 24°57′E
- Country: Romania
- County: Teleorman
- Subdivisions: Ciuperceni, Poiana
- Population (2021-12-01): 1,350
- Time zone: EET/EEST (UTC+2/+3)
- Vehicle reg.: TR

Ciuperceni (Romanian pronunciation: [t͡ʃjuperˈt͡ʃenʲ]) is a commune in Teleorman County, Muntenia, Romania. It is composed of two villages, Ciuperceni and Poiana.
