= Bragadiru, Teleorman =

Bragadiru
- Commune
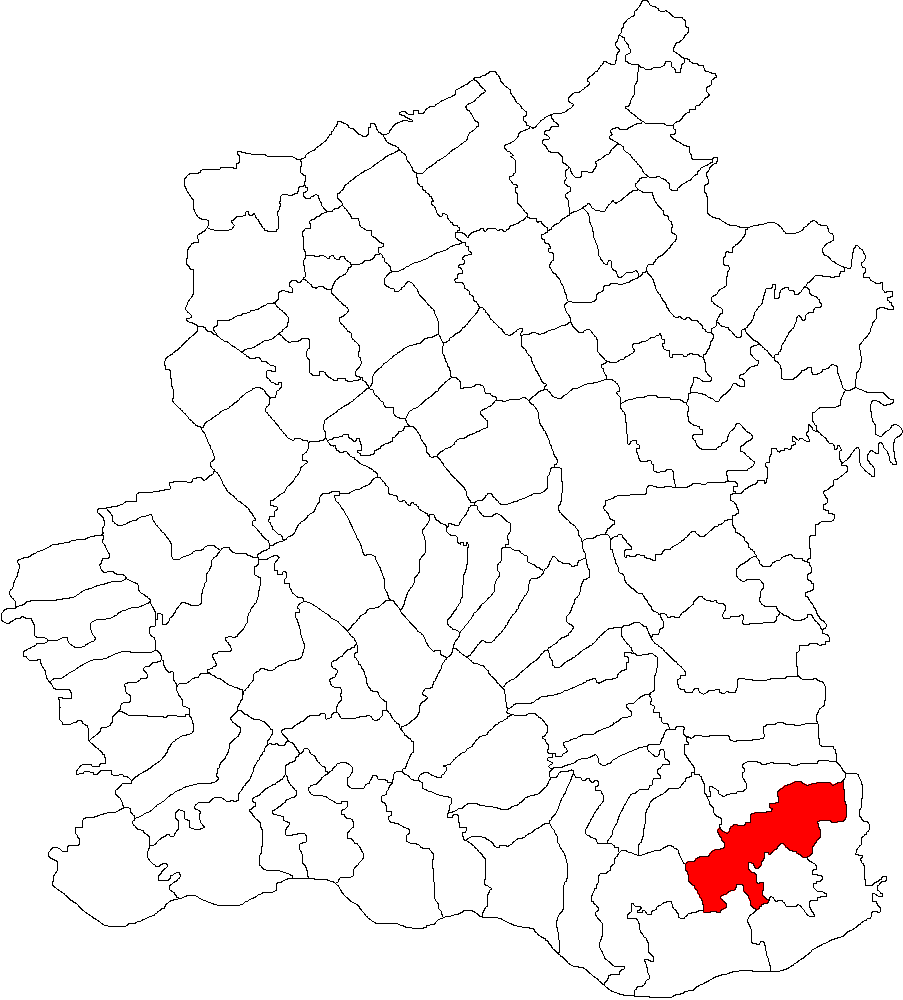
- Location in Teleorman County

- Location in Romania
- Coordinates: 43°46′N 25°31′E
- Country: Romania
- County: Teleorman

Government
  - Mayor (2020–2024): Cristian Ionel Chisac (PNL)
- Population (2021-12-01): 3,327
- Time zone: EET/EEST (UTC+2/+3)
- Vehicle reg.: TR

Bragadiru (Romanian pronunciation: [braɡaˈdiru]) is a commune in Teleorman County, Muntenia, Romania. It is composed of a single village, Bragadiru.
