= Moșneni =

Moşneni may refer to several villages in Romania:

- Moşneni, a village in 23 August Commune, Constanţa County
- Moşneni, a village in Almăj Commune, Dolj County
- Moşneni, a village in Floreşti Commune, Mehedinţi County

== See also ==
- Moșna (disambiguation)
- Moșteni (disambiguation)
