= Țigănești, Teleorman =

Țigănești
- Commune
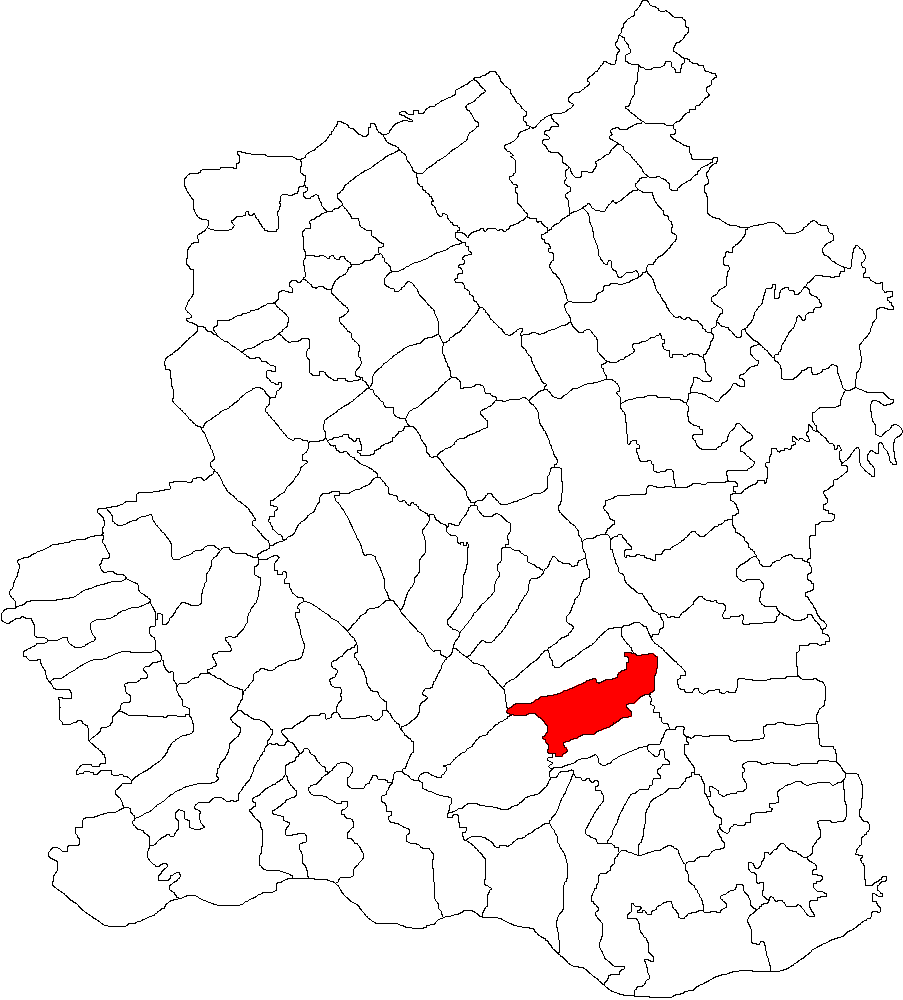
- Location in Teleorman County

- Location in Romania
- Coordinates: 43°54′N 25°22′E
- Country: Romania
- County: Teleorman

Government
  - Mayor (2020–2024): Florian-Gelu Pisică (PSD)
- Area: 30.8 km^{2} (11.9 sq mi)
- Elevation: 36 m (118 ft)
- Population (2021-12-01): 4,012
  - Density: 130/km^{2} (337/sq mi)
- Time zone: UTC+02:00 (EET)
  - Summer (DST): UTC+03:00 (EEST)
- Postal code: 147420
- Area code: +40 247
- Vehicle reg.: TR
- Website: www.comunatiganesti.ro

Țigănești is a commune in Teleorman County, Muntenia, Romania. It is composed of a single village, Țigănești.
