= Izvoarele, Teleorman =

Izvoarele
- Commune
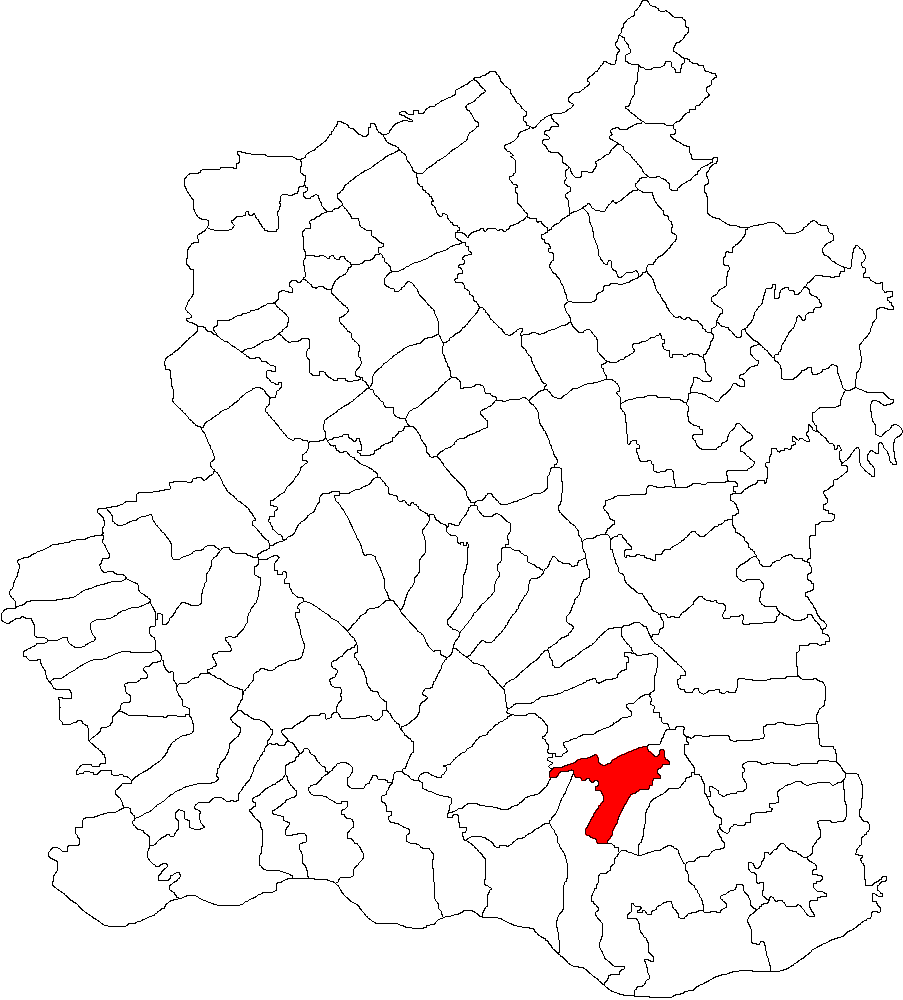
- Location in Teleorman County

- Location in Romania
- Coordinates: 43°50′N 25°24′E
- Country: Romania
- County: Teleorman
- Population (2021-12-01): 2,048
- Time zone: EET/EEST (UTC+2/+3)
- Vehicle reg.: TR

Izvoarele (Romanian pronunciation: [izˈvo̯arele]) is a commune in Teleorman County, Muntenia, Romania. It is composed of a single village, Izvoarele.
