= Putineiu, Teleorman =

Putineiu
- Commune
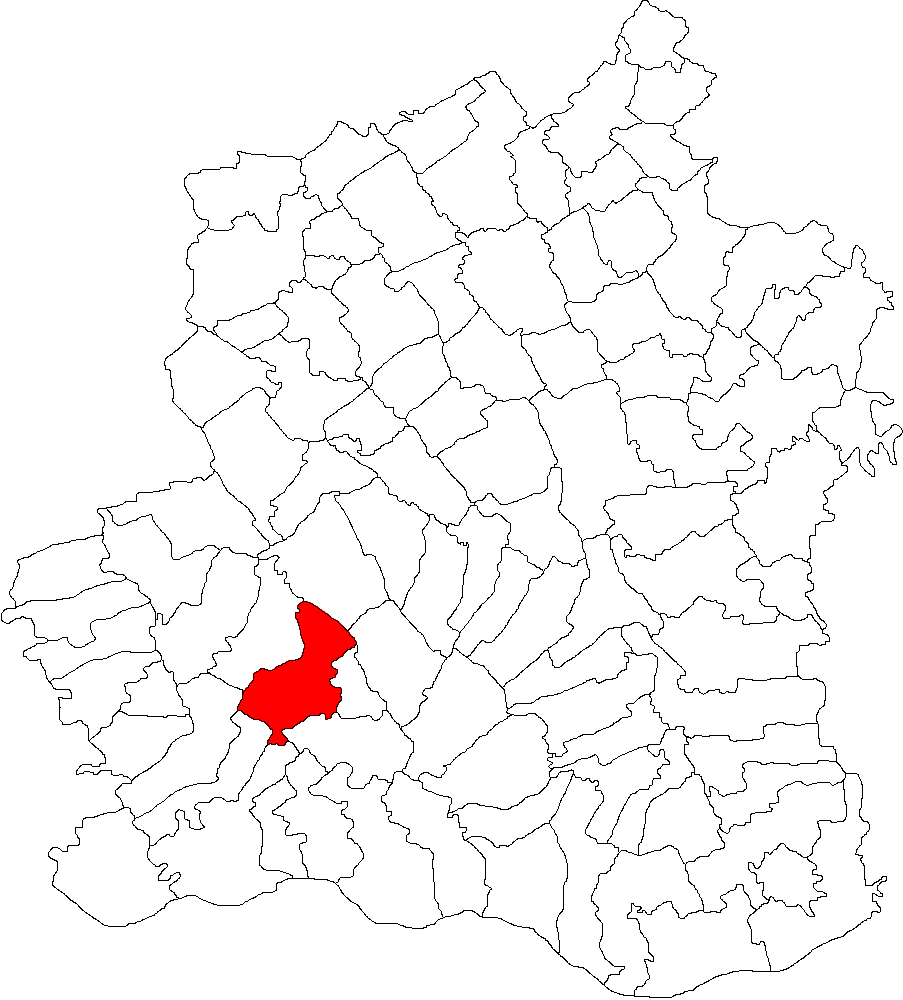
- Location in Teleorman County

- Location in Romania
- Coordinates: 43°54′N 24°58′E
- Country: Romania
- County: Teleorman
- Subdivisions: Băduleasa, Cârlomanu, Putineiu
- Population (2021-12-01): 2,058
- Time zone: EET/EEST (UTC+2/+3)
- Vehicle reg.: TR

Putineiu is a commune in Teleorman County, Muntenia, Romania. It is composed of three villages: Băduleasa, Cârlomanu and Putineiu.
