= Seaca, Teleorman =

Seaca
- Commune
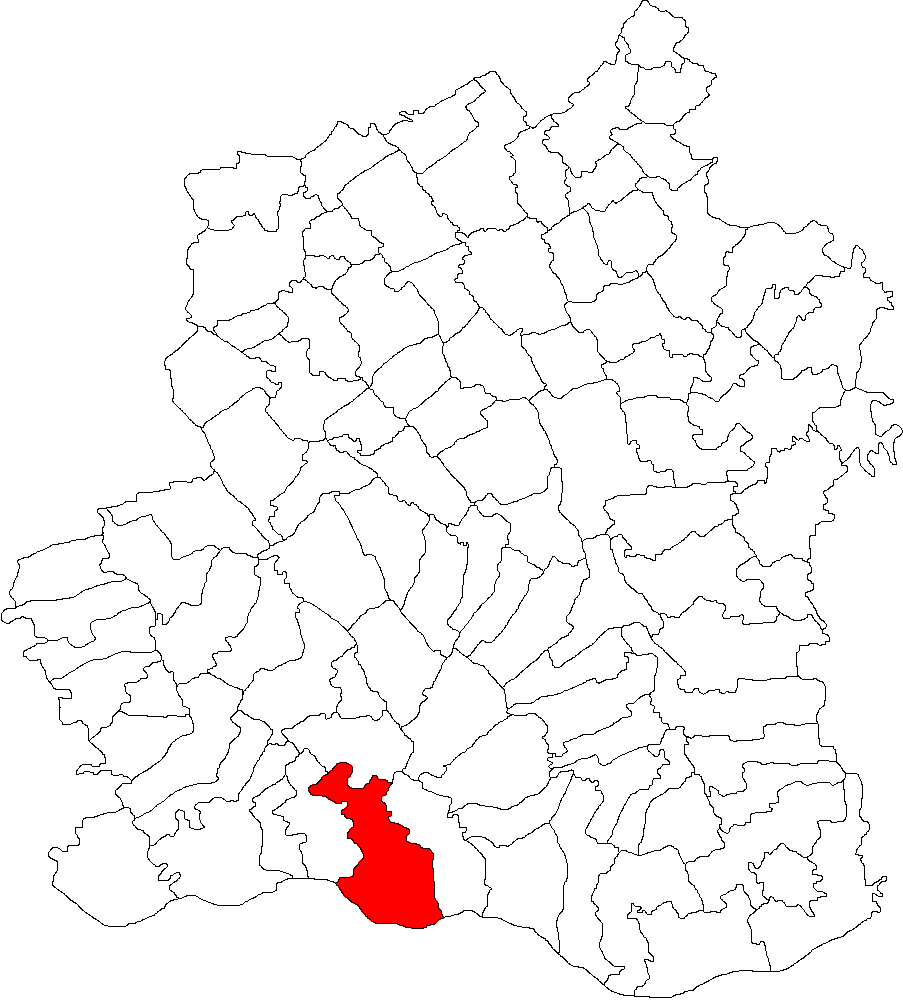
- Location in Teleorman County

- Location in Romania
- Coordinates: 43°45′N 25°04′E
- Country: Romania
- County: Teleorman
- Subdivisions: Năvodari, Seaca
- Population (2021-12-01): 2,212
- Time zone: EET/EEST (UTC+2/+3)
- Vehicle reg.: TR

Seaca is a commune in Teleorman County, Muntenia, Romania, about 15 km east of Turnu Măgurele and 10 km north of the Danube River. Its population is about 2,500 people. It is composed of two villages, Năvodari and Seaca. The majority of people speak Romanian, with some speaking a form of the Romani language. A sizable part of the residents are landowners. The main crops planted are grains such as wheat, corn, and to a smaller degree rice. A smaller percentage of the residents work in nearby cities, mainly in Turnu Măgurele and to a lesser degree in Alexandria.

== Religion ==
The majority of people are Romanian Orthodox, though there is a very small number of Seventh-day Adventists. The commune has one Orthodox church in the center of the town that fronts on the main paved road that runs from Turnu Măgurele to Zimnicea and one Seventh-day Adventist church that is situated on a more secluded street. Most of the Orthodox population attends church rarely, especially younger people. However, the Seventh Day Adventists tend to be more religious in nature.

== Entertainment ==
A small minority of the population frequents the several bars and bodegas almost nightly. There they drink cheap spirits in the winter and beer in the summer. The young usually gather in a town hall and listen to music, mostly manele. This is usually the place to meet new people.

A sizable number of households have TV sets. With a regular antenna they can view channels broadcast from Bucharest and sometimes from nearby Bulgaria. Satellite connection is only available through dish. Many people have bought dishes and are able to view most of the main satellite channels.

Soccer is the predominant sport in the commune as it is in most of Romania, and is usually played on local fields during the summer months by people of all ages. During winter, bob-sledding is a favorite sport and one can see young and old sledding down the many slopes that surround the commune.
