= Lisa, Teleorman =

Lisa
- Commune
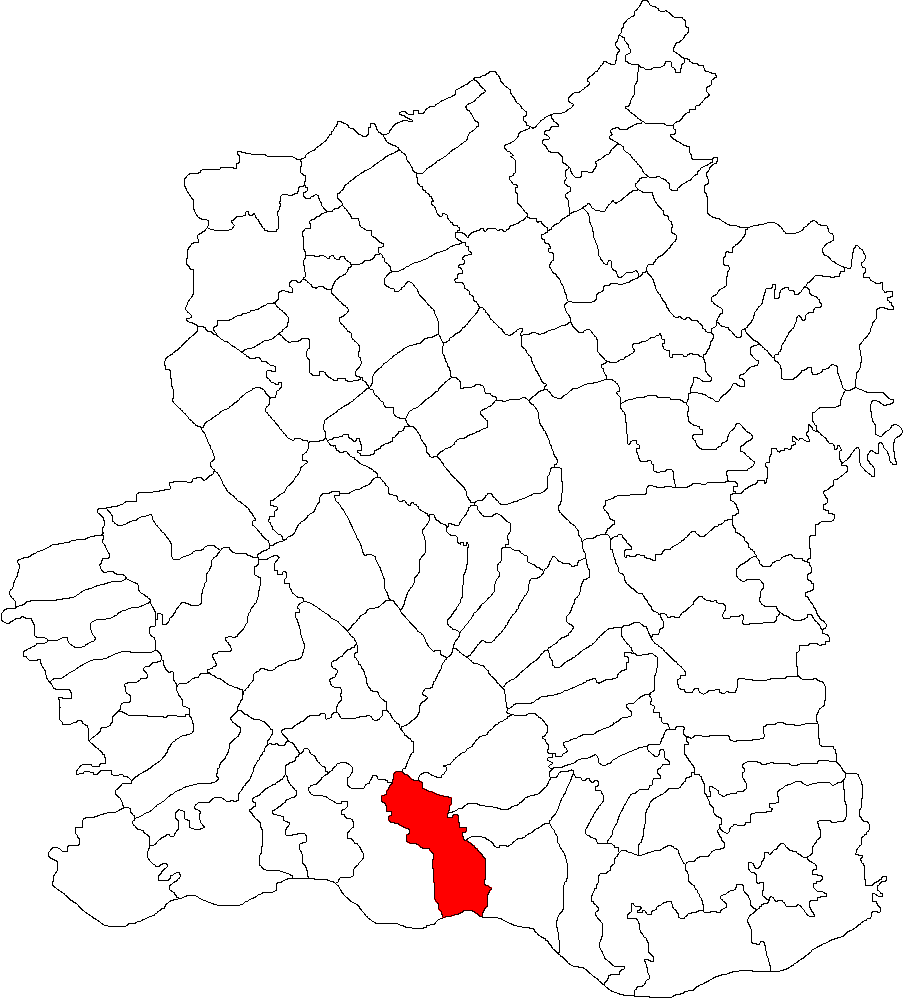
- Location in Teleorman County

- Location in Romania
- Coordinates: 43°48′N 25°08′E
- Country: Romania
- County: Teleorman
- Subdivisions: Lisa, Vânători
- Population (2021-12-01): 1,964
- Time zone: EET/EEST (UTC+2/+3)
- Vehicle reg.: TR

Lisa (Romanian pronunciation: [ˈlisa]) is a commune in Teleorman County, Muntenia, Romania. It is composed of two villages, Lisa and Vânători.
