= Zâmbreasca =

- Commune
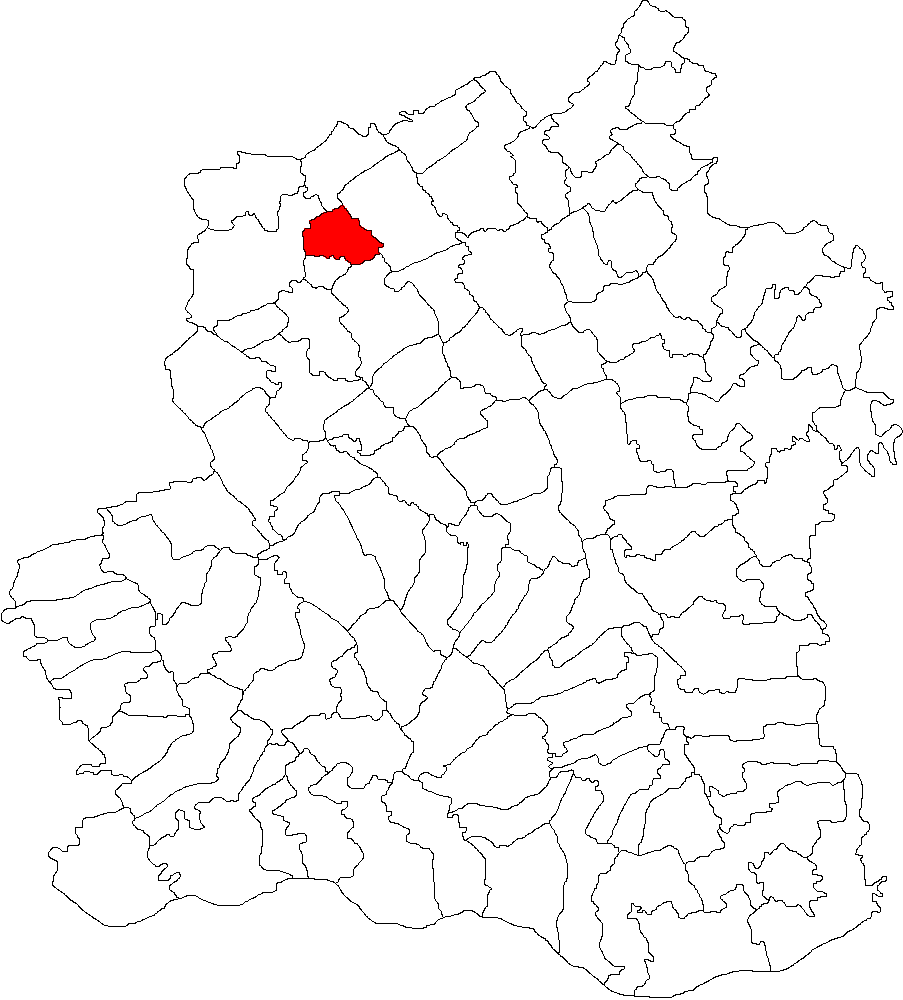
- Location in Teleorman County

- Location in Romania
- Coordinates: 44°19′N 24°59′E
- Country: Romania
- County: Teleorman

Government
  - Mayor (2020–2024): Marin Răduț (PSD)
- Area: 59.42 km^{2} (22.94 sq mi)
- Elevation: 133 m (436 ft)
- Population (2021-12-01): 1,192
  - Density: 20/km^{2} (52/sq mi)
- Time zone: EET/EEST (UTC+2/+3)
- Postal code: 147445
- Area code: +(40) 247
- Vehicle reg.: TR
- Website: primariazambreasca.ro

Zâmbreasca is a commune in Teleorman County, Muntenia, Romania. It is composed of a single village, Zâmbreasca.
