= Răsmirești =

- Commune
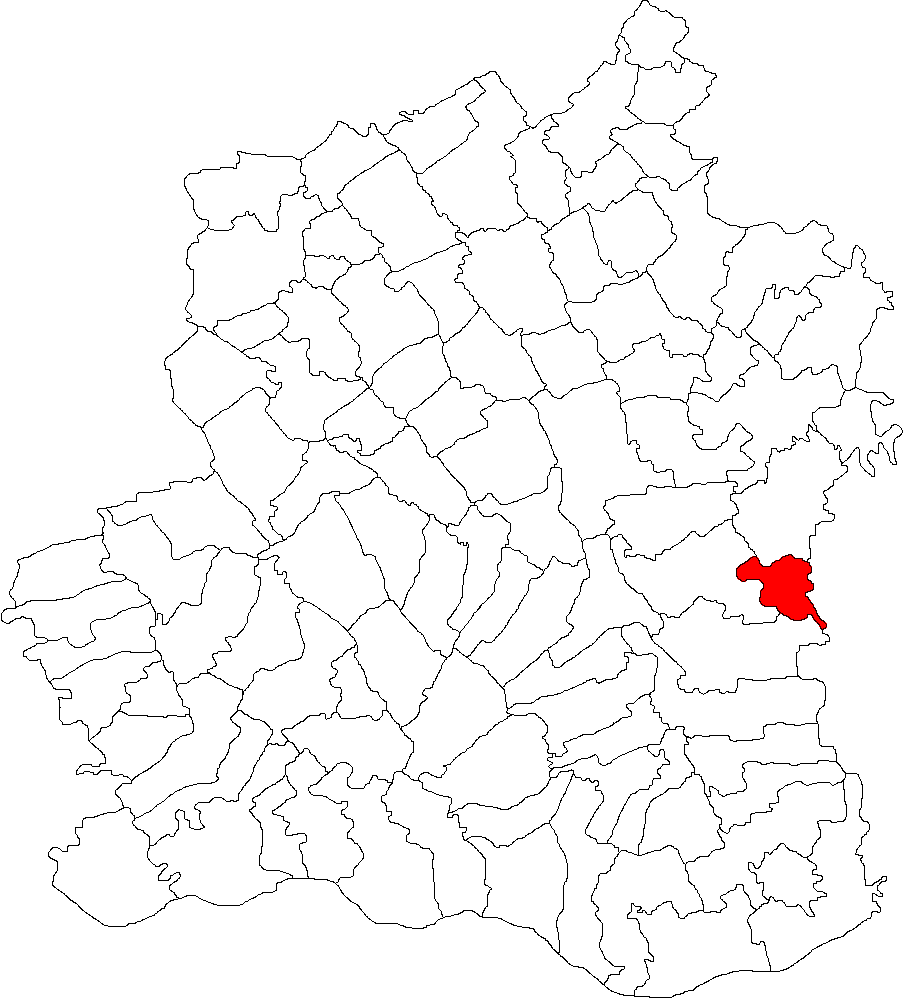
- Location in Teleorman County

- Location in Romania
- Coordinates: 43°59′N 25°33′E
- Country: Romania
- County: Teleorman
- Subdivisions: Ludăneasca, Răsmirești
- Population (2021-12-01): 887
- Time zone: EET/EEST (UTC+2/+3)
- Vehicle reg.: TR

Răsmirești is a commune in Teleorman County, Muntenia, Romania. It is composed of two villages, Ludăneasca and Răsmirești.
