= Scrioaștea =

- Commune
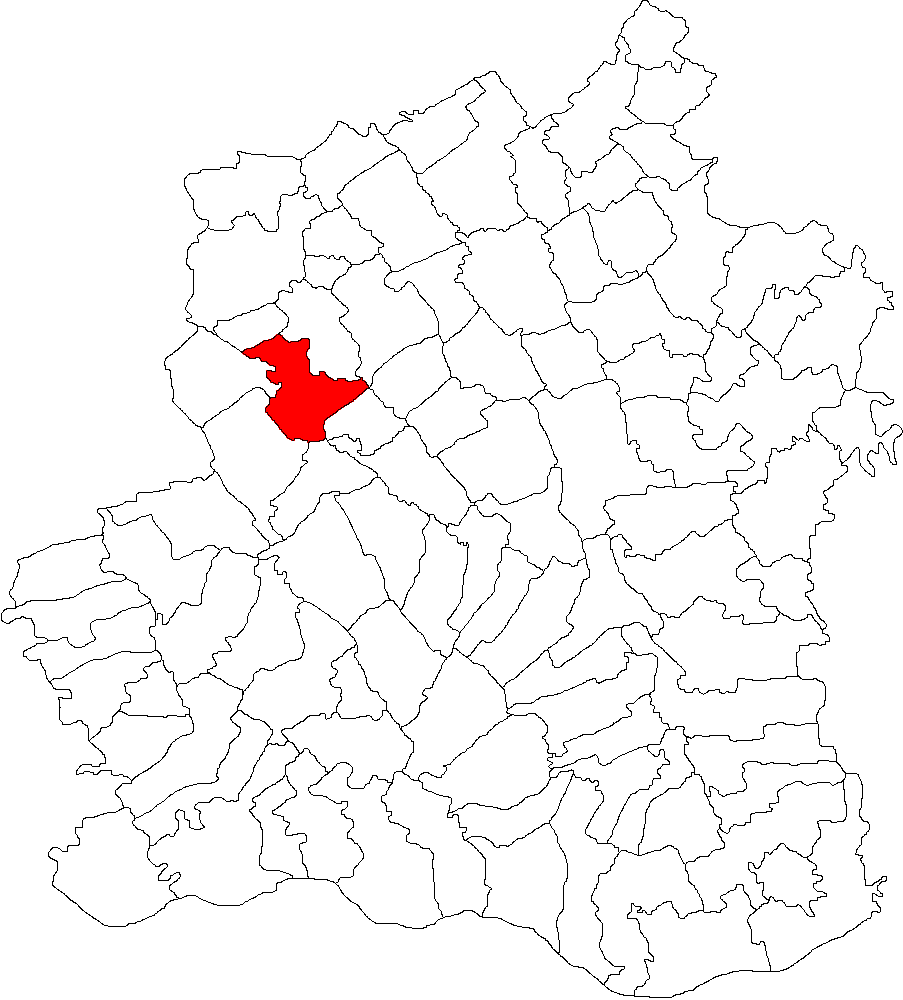
- Location in Teleorman County

- Location in Romania
- Coordinates: 44°09′N 24°57′E
- Country: Romania
- County: Teleorman
- Subdivisions: Brebina, Cucueți, Scrioaștea, Viile
- Population (2021-12-01): 3,524
- Time zone: EET/EEST (UTC+2/+3)
- Vehicle reg.: TR

Scrioaștea is a commune in Teleorman County, Muntenia, Romania. It is composed of four villages: Brebina, Cucueți, Scrioaștea and Viile.
