= Gălăteni =

- Commune
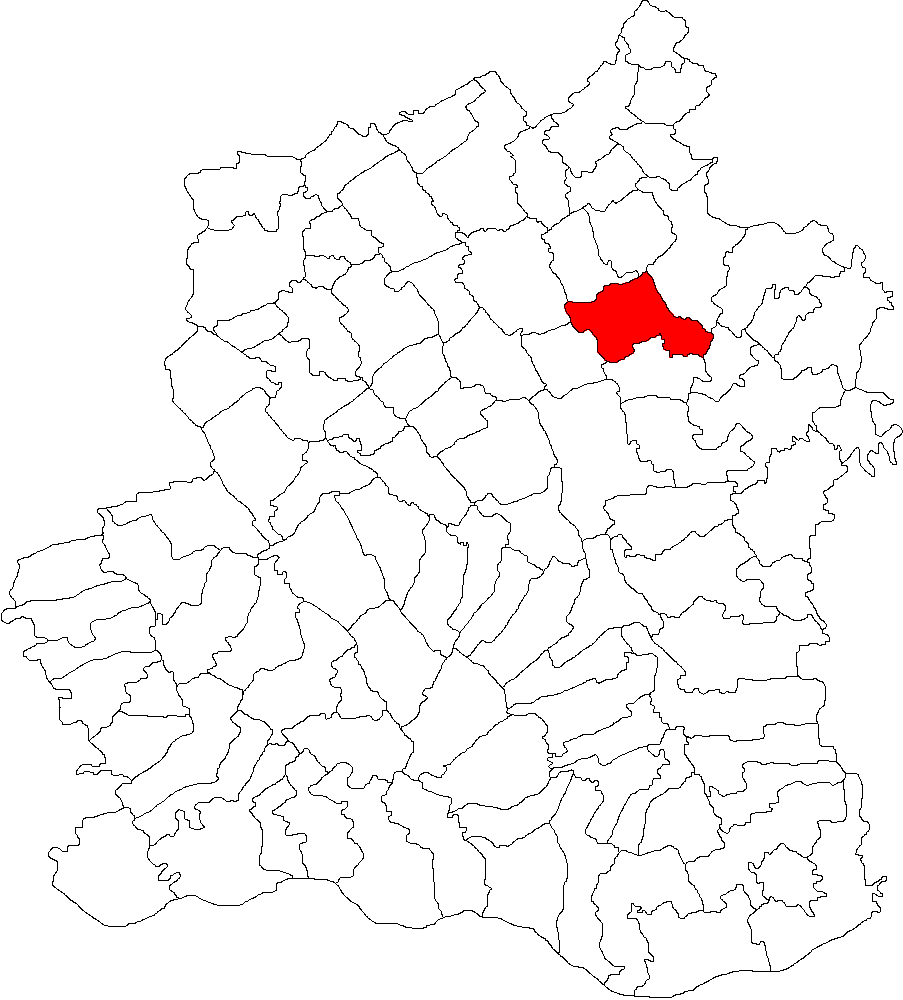
- Location in Teleorman County

- Location in Romania
- Coordinates: 44°13′N 25°21′E
- Country: Romania
- County: Teleorman
- Subdivisions: Bâscoveni, Gălăteni, Grădișteanca
- Population (2021-12-01): 2,426
- Time zone: UTC+02:00 (EET)
  - Summer (DST): UTC+03:00 (EEST)
- Vehicle reg.: TR

Gălăteni (Romanian pronunciation: [gələˈtenʲ]) is a commune in Teleorman County, Muntenia, Romania. It is composed of three villages: Bâscoveni, Gălăteni and Grădișteanca.
