= Frumoasa, Teleorman =

Frumoasa
- Commune
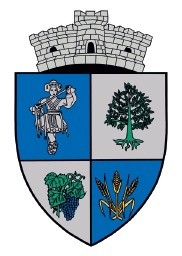
- Coat of arms

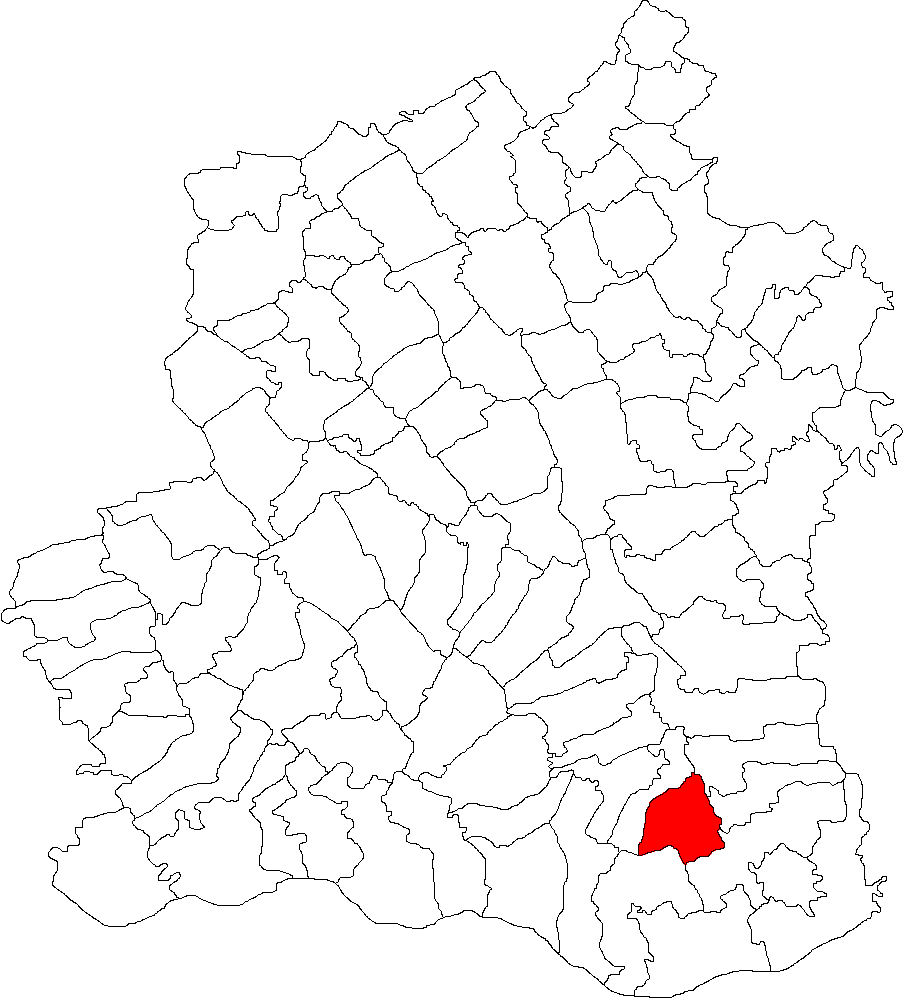
- Location in Teleorman County

- Location in Romania
- Coordinates: 43°48′N 25°28′E
- Country: Romania
- County: Teleorman
- Subdivisions: Frumoasa, Păuleasca
- Population (2021-12-01): 1,721
- Time zone: UTC+02:00 (EET)
  - Summer (DST): UTC+03:00 (EEST)
- Vehicle reg.: TR

Frumoasa (Romanian pronunciation: [fruˈmo̯asa]) is a commune in Teleorman County, Muntenia, Romania. It is composed of two villages, Frumoasa and Păuleasca.
