= Călmățuiu =

- Commune
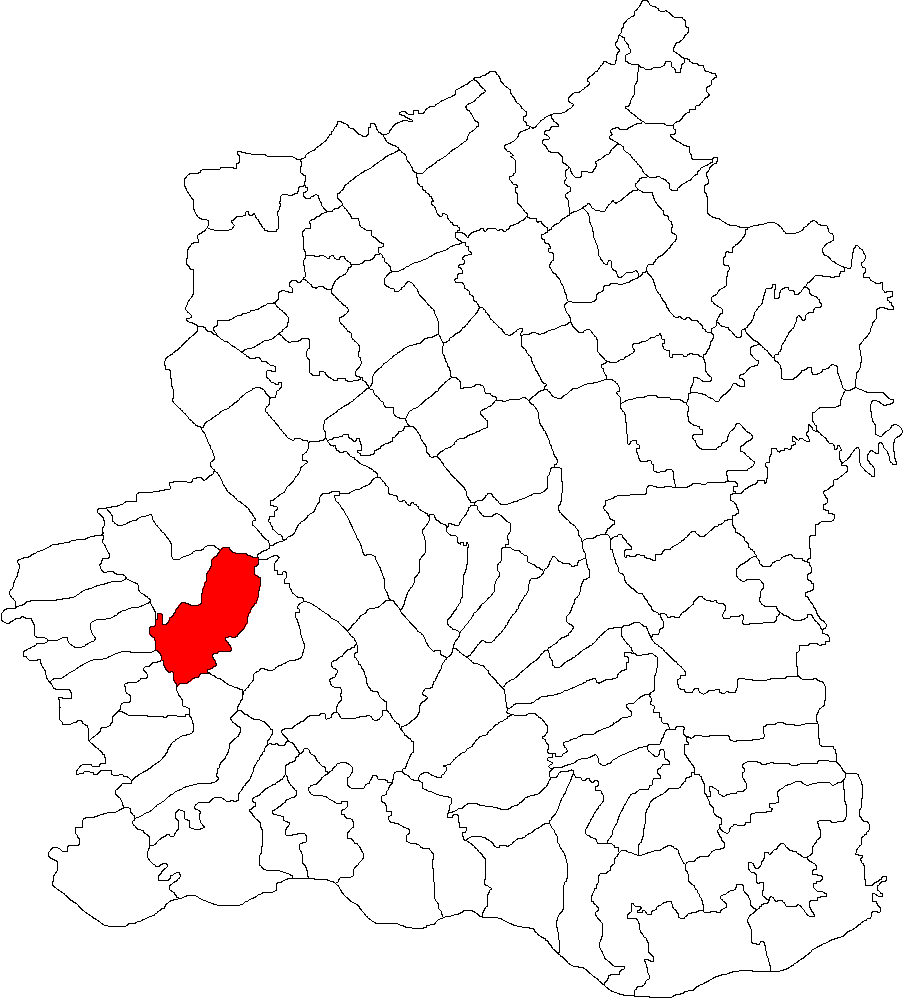
- Location in Teleorman County

- Location in Romania
- Coordinates: 43°58′N 24°52′E
- Country: Romania
- County: Teleorman
- Subdivisions: Bujoru, Caravaneți, Călmățuiu, Nicolae Bălcescu

Government
  - Mayor (2020–2024): George Valentin Nițu (PSD)
- Population (2021-12-01): 1,566
- Time zone: EET/EEST (UTC+2/+3)
- Vehicle reg.: TR

Călmățuiu (Romanian pronunciation: [kəlməˈt͡suju]) is a commune in Teleorman County, Muntenia, Romania. It is composed of four villages: Bujoru, Caravaneți, Călmățuiu and Nicolae Bălcescu. The river Călmățui passes through the commune.
