= Traian, Teleorman =

Traian
- Commune
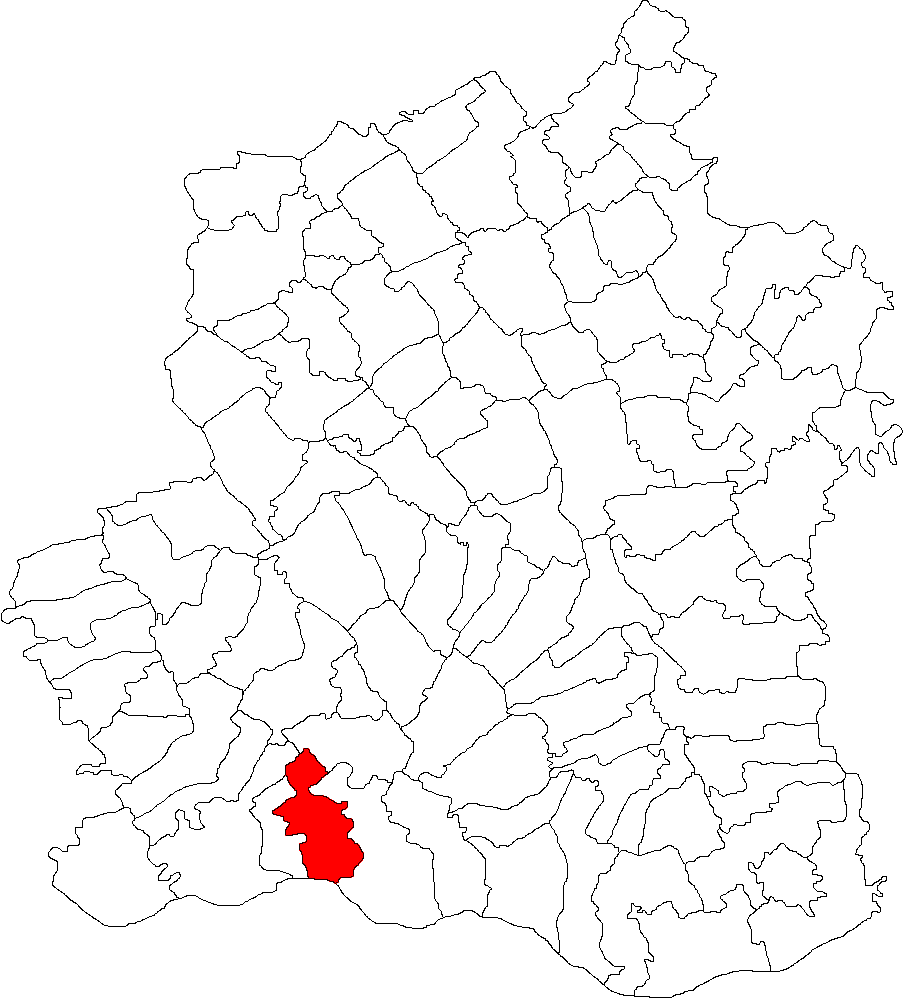
- Location in Teleorman County

- Location in Romania
- Coordinates: 43°46′N 25°00′E
- Country: Romania
- County: Teleorman

Government
  - Mayor (2020–2024): Gabriel Cristea (PSD)
- Area: 52.50 km^{2} (20.27 sq mi)
- Elevation: 29 m (95 ft)
- Population (2021-12-01): 1,421
  - Density: 27/km^{2} (70/sq mi)
- Time zone: EET/EEST (UTC+2/+3)
- Postal code: 147405
- Area code: +(40) 247
- Vehicle reg.: TR
- Website: primariatraiantr.ro

Traian is a commune in Teleorman County, Muntenia, Romania. It is composed of a single village, Traian.

The commune is located in the southern part of the county, on the left bank of the Danube.
