= Dobrotești, Teleorman =

Dobrotești
- Commune
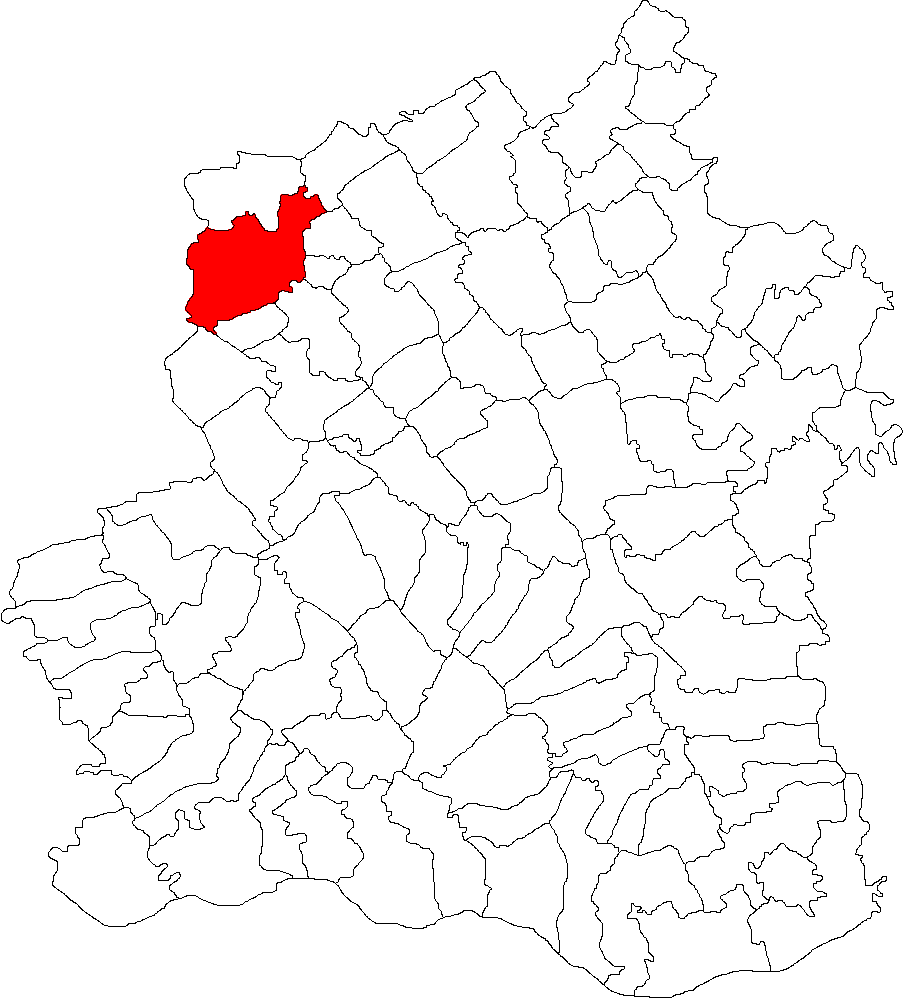
- Location in Teleorman County

- Location in Romania
- Coordinates: 44°17′N 24°53′E
- Country: Romania
- County: Teleorman
- Subdivisions: Dobrotești, Merișani

Government
  - Mayor (2020–2024): Ion Mănica (PSD)
- Area: 106.43 km^{2} (41.09 sq mi)
- Elevation: 128 m (420 ft)
- Population (2021-12-01): 3,845
  - Density: 36/km^{2} (94/sq mi)
- Time zone: EET/EEST (UTC+2/+3)
- Postal code: 147115
- Area code: +(40) 247
- Vehicle reg.: TR
- Website: www.comunadobrotesti.ro

Dobrotești (Romanian pronunciation: [dobroˈteʃtʲ]) is a commune in Teleorman County, Muntenia, Romania. It is composed of two villages, Dobrotești and Merișani.

Historical population
Year	Pop.	±%
2002	5,222	—
2011	4,605	−11.8%
2021	3,845	−16.5%
Source: Census data

== Natives ==
- Ioan Ianolide (1919–1986), writer
