= Olteni =

- Commune
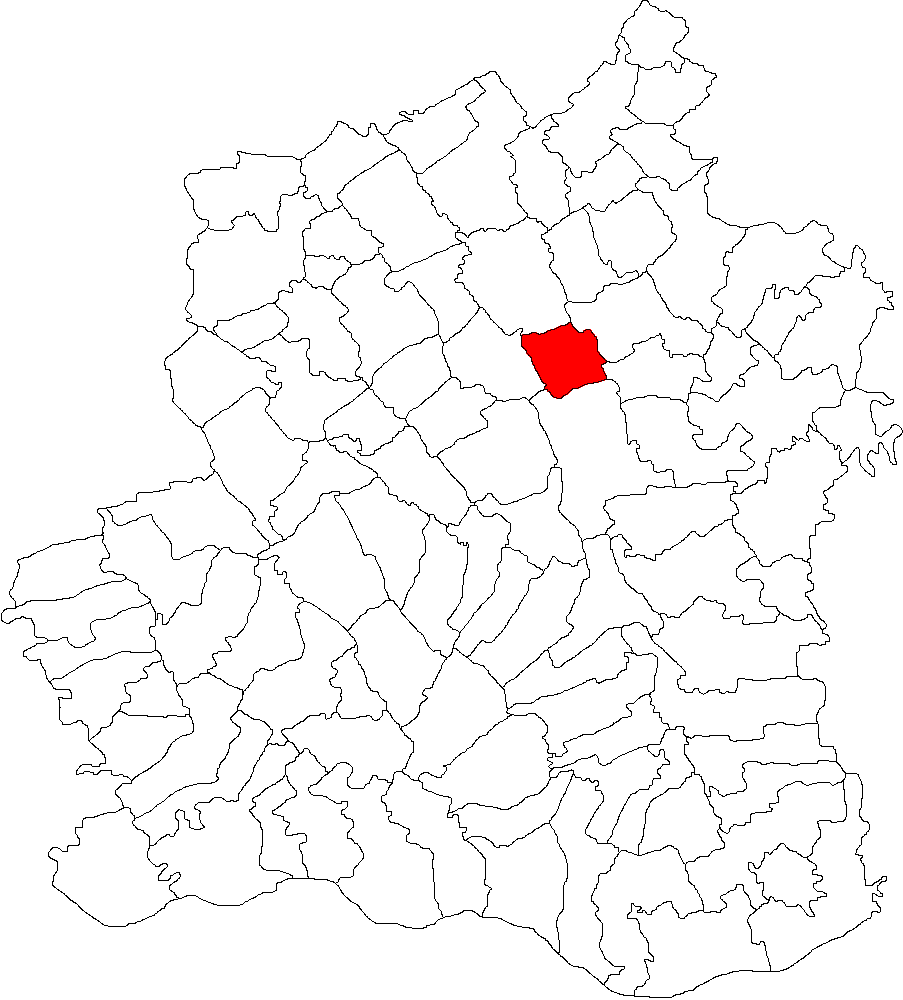
- Location in Teleorman County

- Location in Romania
- Coordinates: 44°11′N 25°17′E
- Country: Romania
- County: Teleorman
- Subdivisions: Olteni, Perii Broșteni

Government
  - Mayor (2020–2024): Violeta Ionescu (PNL)
- Area: 38.45 km^{2} (14.85 sq mi)
- Elevation: 76 m (249 ft)
- Population (2021-12-01): 3,013
  - Density: 78/km^{2} (200/sq mi)
- Time zone: EET/EEST (UTC+2/+3)
- Postal code: 147230
- Area code: +(40) 247
- Vehicle reg.: TR
- Website: www.primariaolteni.ro

Olteni (Romanian pronunciation: [olˈtenʲ]) is a commune in Teleorman County, Muntenia, Romania. It is composed of two villages, Olteni and Perii Broșteni.

== See also ==
- Juventus Olteni
