= Drăgănești de Vede =

- Commune
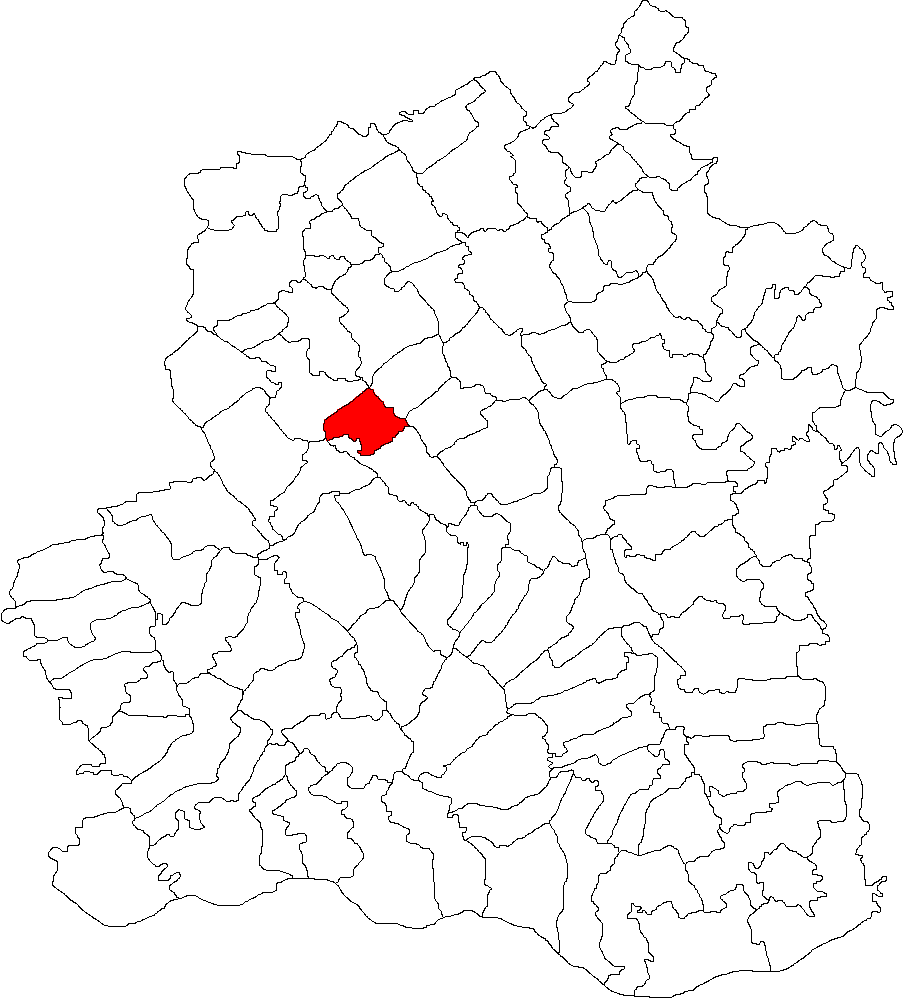
- Location in Teleorman County

- Location in Romania
- Coordinates: 44°08′N 25°03′E
- Country: Romania
- County: Teleorman
- Subdivisions: Drăgănești de Vede, Măgura cu Liliac, Văcărești

Government
  - Mayor (2020–2024): Marius Stanciu (PLUS)
- Population (2021-12-01): 1,974
- Time zone: EET/EEST (UTC+2/+3)
- Vehicle reg.: TR

Drăgănești de Vede (Romanian pronunciation: [drəɡəˈneʃtʲ de ˈvede]) is a commune in Teleorman County, Muntenia, Romania. It is composed of three villages: Drăgănești de Vede, Măgura cu Liliac and Văcărești.
