= Sfințești =

- Commune
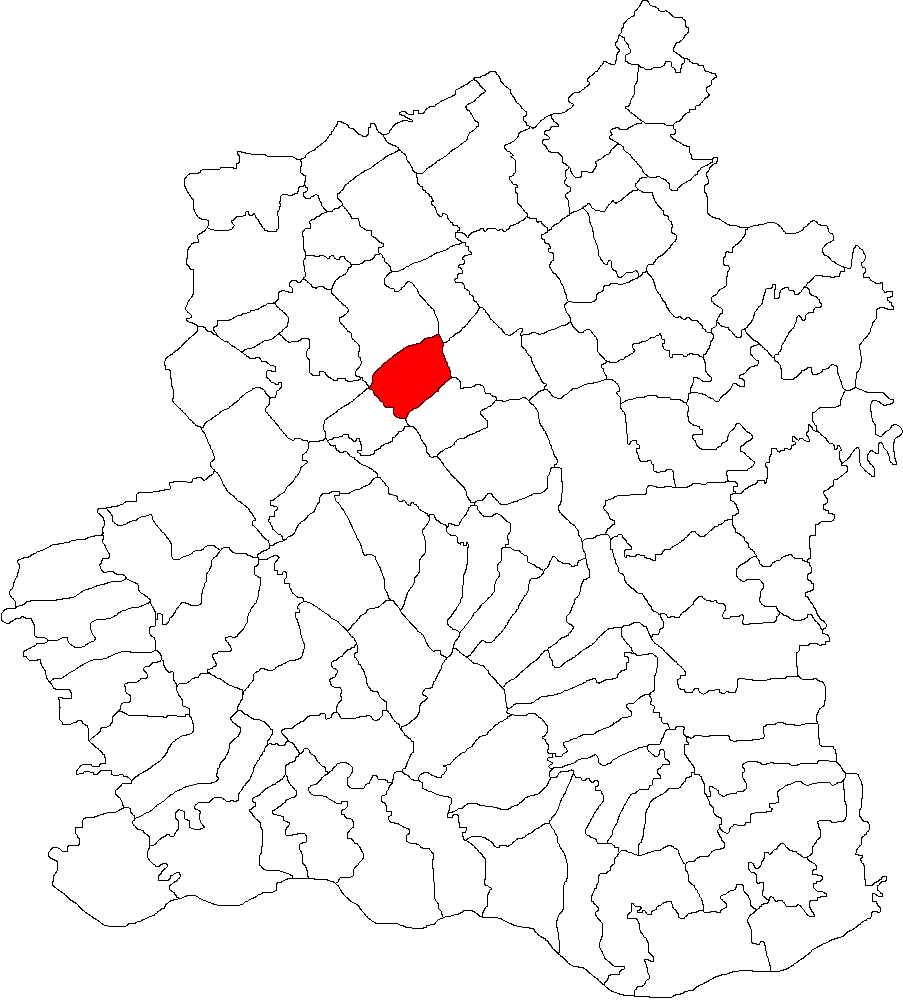
- Location in Teleorman County

- Location in Romania
- Coordinates: 44°11′N 25°06′E
- Country: Romania
- County: Teleorman
- Population (2021-12-01): 947
- Time zone: EET/EEST (UTC+2/+3)
- Vehicle reg.: TR

Sfințești is a commune in Teleorman County, Muntenia, Romania. It is composed of a single village, Sfințești.
