= Măldăeni =

- Commune
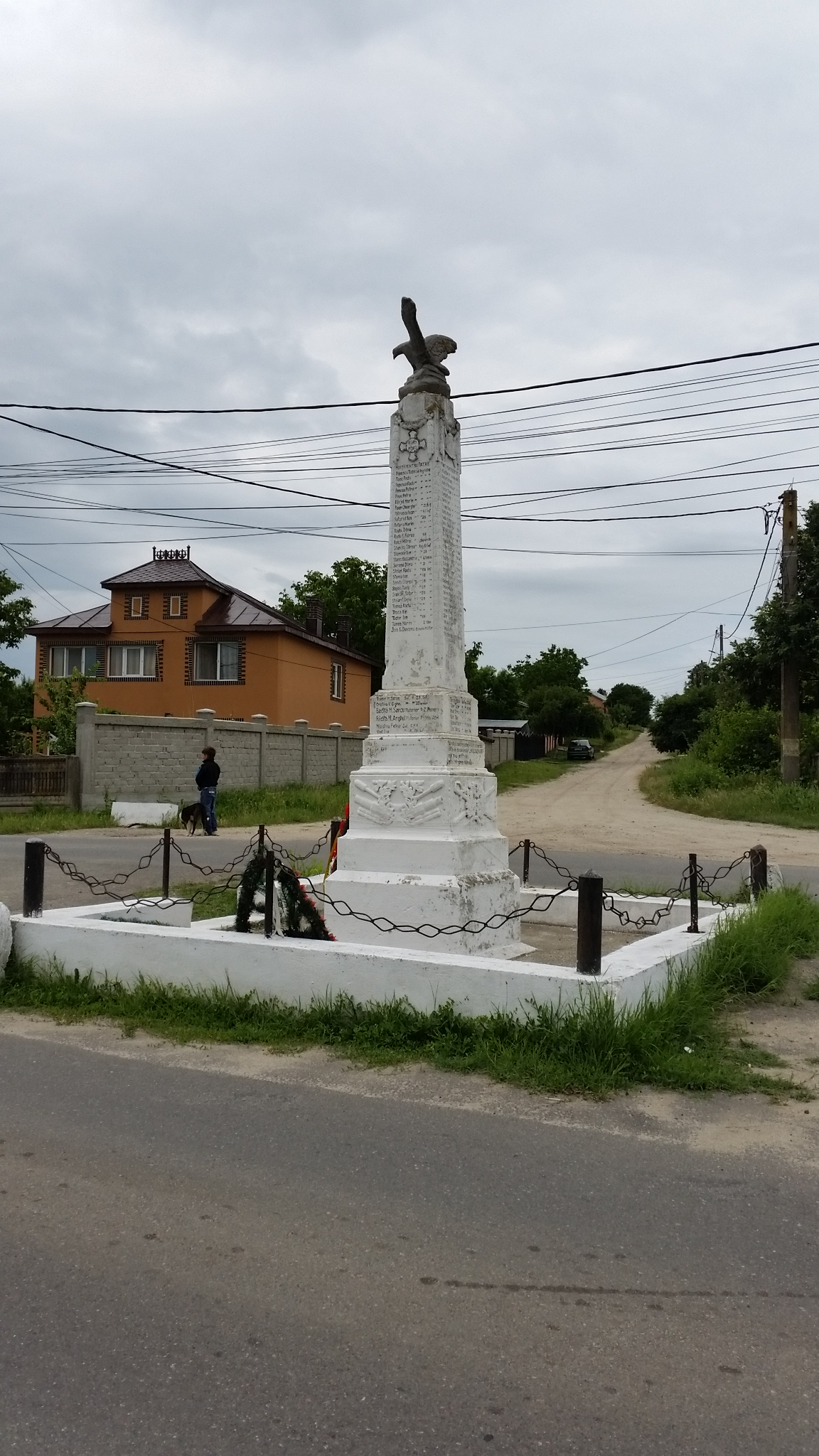
- Monument in Măldăeni

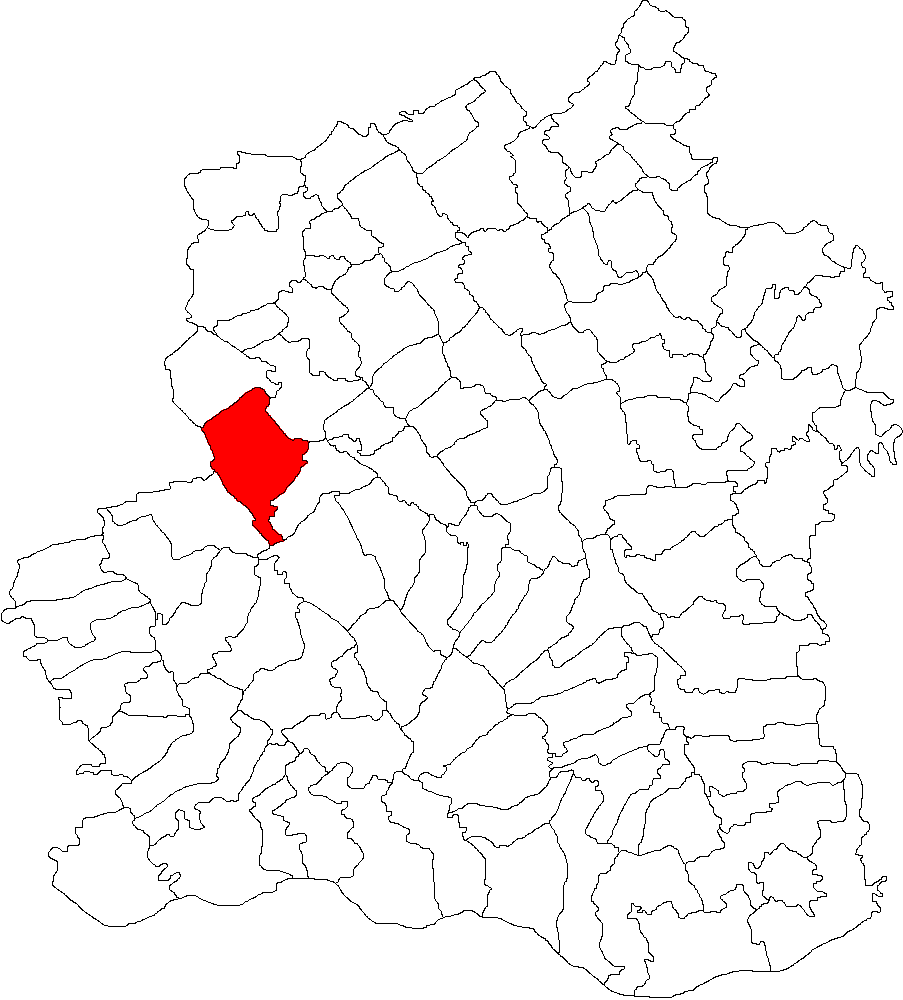
- Location in Teleorman County

- Location in Romania
- Coordinates: 44°07′N 24°56′E
- Country: Romania
- County: Teleorman

Government
  - Mayor (2020–2024): Ion Oprina (PSD)
- Area: 76.69 km^{2} (29.61 sq mi)
- Elevation: 96 m (315 ft)
- Population (2021-12-01): 3,559
  - Density: 46.41/km^{2} (120.2/sq mi)
- Time zone: UTC+02:00 (EET)
  - Summer (DST): UTC+03:00 (EEST)
- Postal code: 147195
- Area code: +(40) 247
- Vehicle reg.: TR
- Website: www.primariamaldaeni.ro

Măldăeni is a commune in Teleorman County, Muntenia, Romania. It is composed of a single village, Măldăeni.
