= Moșna =

Moșna may refer to several places in Romania:

- Moșna, Iași, a commune in Iași County
- Moșna, Sibiu, a commune in Sibiu County
- Moșna (Prut), a tributary of the Prut in Iași County
- Moșna (Târnava Mare), a tributary of the Târnava Mare in Sibiu County

== See also ==
- Mosna (disambiguation)
- Moșneni (disambiguation)
- Moșteni (disambiguation)
