= Conțești, Teleorman =

Conțești
- Commune
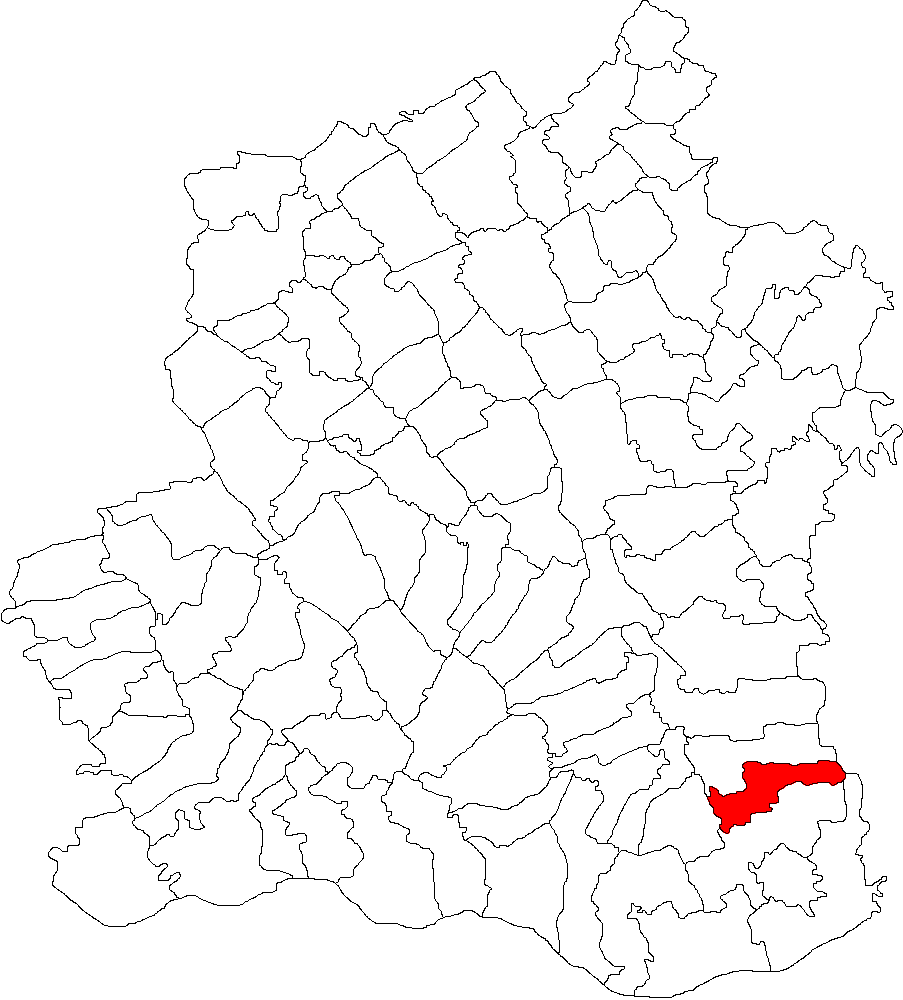
- Location in Teleorman County

- Location in Romania
- Coordinates: 43°48′N 25°29′E
- Country: Romania
- County: Teleorman
- Population (2021-12-01): 3,012
- Time zone: EET/EEST (UTC+2/+3)
- Vehicle reg.: TR

Conțești (Romanian pronunciation: [konˈt͡seʃtʲ]) is a commune in Teleorman County, Muntenia, Romania. It is composed of a single village, Conțești.
