= Piatra, Teleorman =

Piatra
- Commune
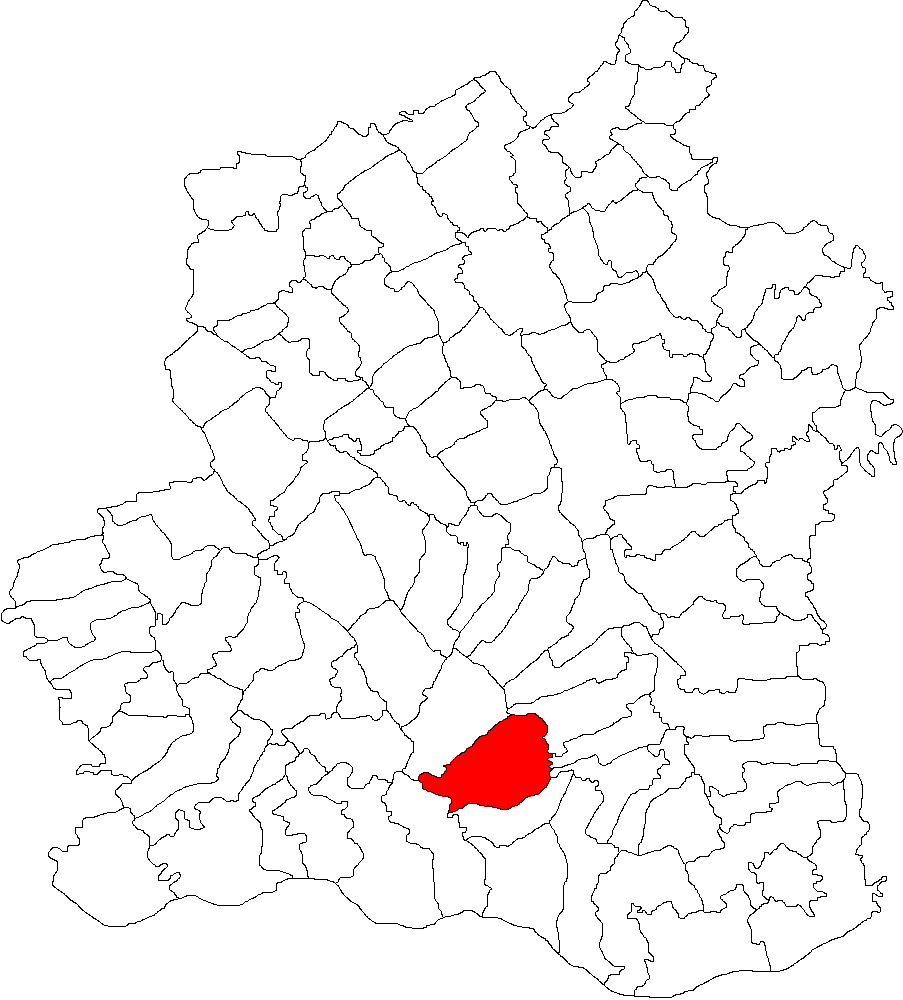
- Location in Teleorman County

- Location in Romania
- Coordinates: 43°49′N 25°10′E
- Country: Romania
- County: Teleorman

Government
  - Mayor (2020–2024): Costel Strîmbu (PNL)
- Population (2021-12-01): 2,744
- Time zone: EET/EEST (UTC+2/+3)
- Vehicle reg.: TR

Piatra is a commune in Teleorman County, Muntenia, Romania. It is composed of a single village, Piatra.
