= Mosna (surname) =

Mosna is an Italian surname. Notable people with the surname include:

- Diego Mosna (born 1948), Italian entrepreneur
- Gabriel Mosna (1992–2016), Brazilian vocalist of Brazilian Death Metal Band Neurotóxico
- Miguel Mosna (born 1962), Argentine boxer
