= Moșteni =

- Commune
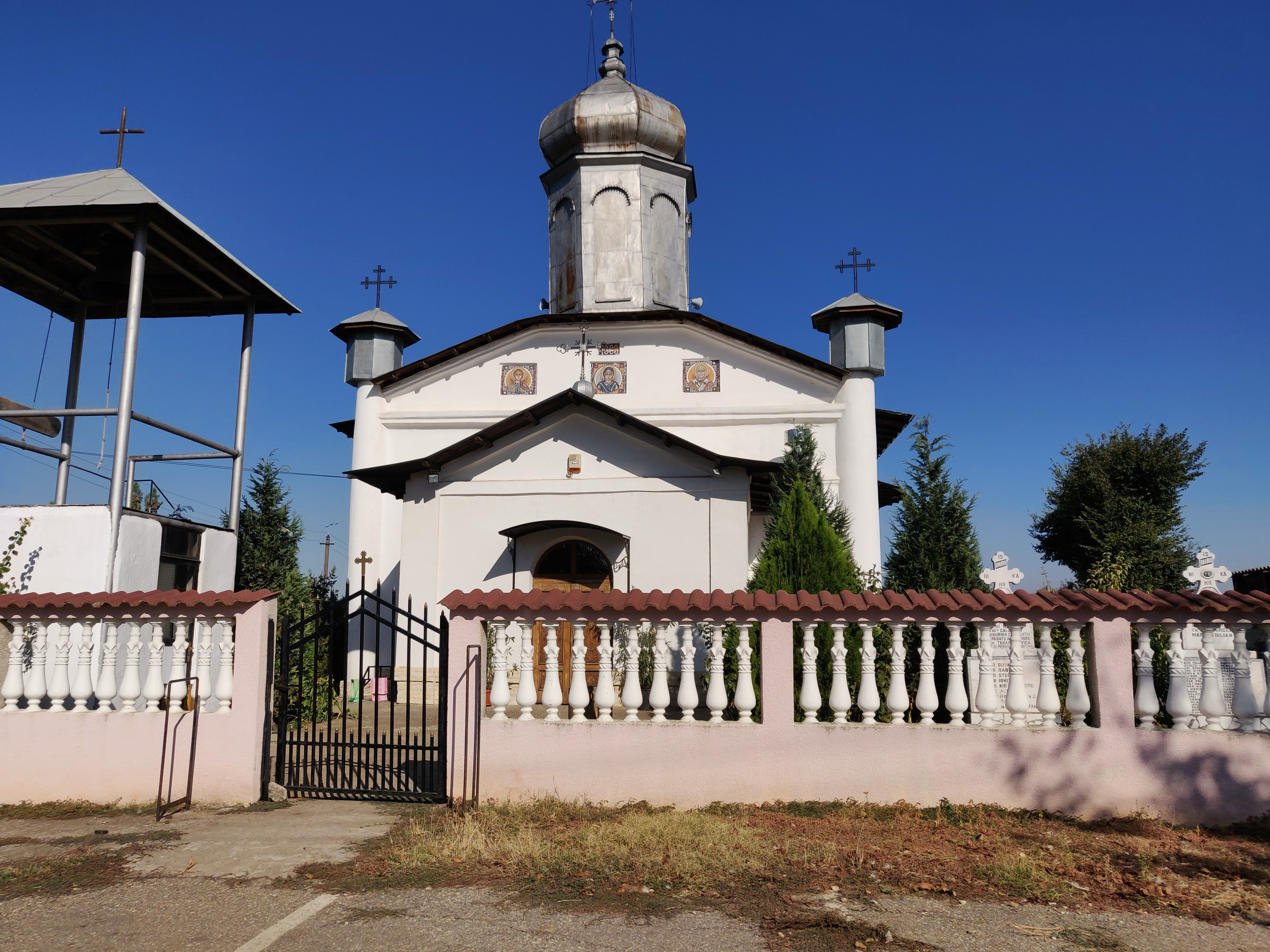
- Church in Moșteni

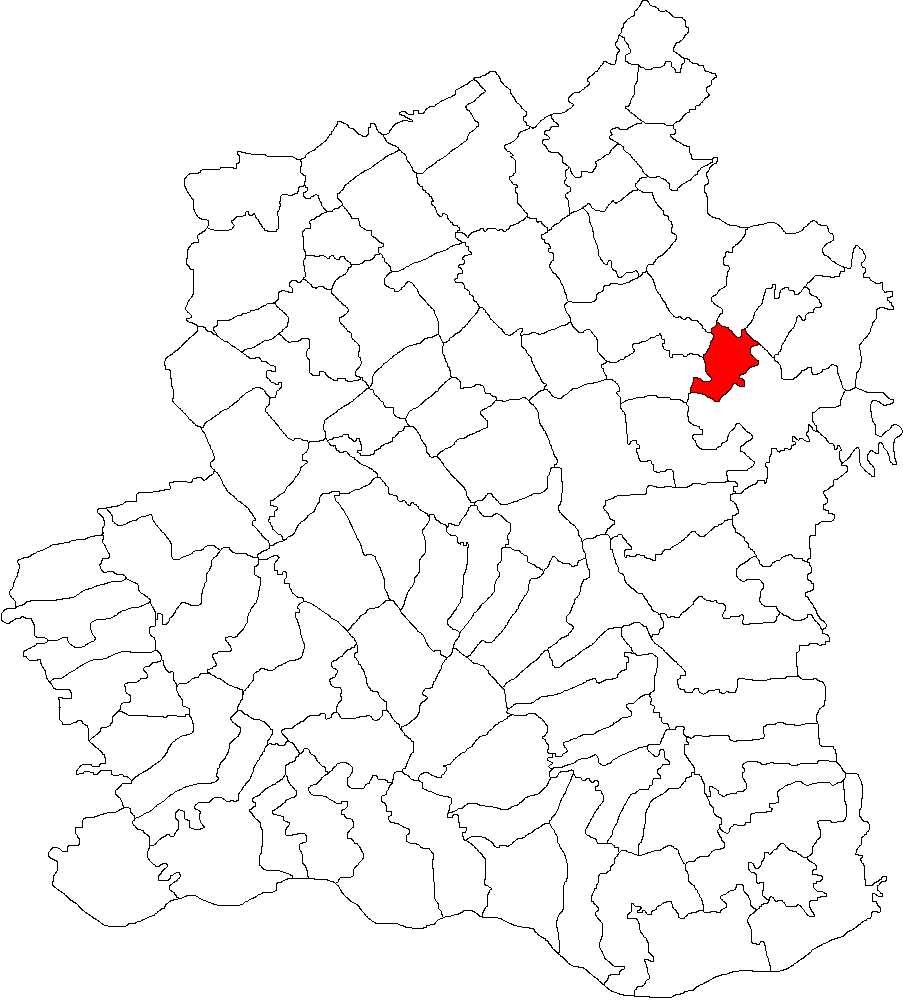
- Location in Teleorman County

- Location in Romania
- Coordinates: 44°12′N 25°30′E
- Country: Romania
- County: Teleorman

Government
  - Mayor (2020–2024): Vică Tăbărana (PNL)
- Area: 28.86 km^{2} (11.14 sq mi)
- Elevation: 97 m (318 ft)
- Population (2021-12-01): 1,410
  - Density: 48.9/km^{2} (127/sq mi)
- Time zone: UTC+02:00 (EET)
  - Summer (DST): UTC+03:00 (EEST)
- Postal code: 147210
- Area code: +(40) 247
- Vehicle reg.: TR
- Website: www.comunamosteni.ro

Moșteni is a commune located in Teleorman County, Muntenia, Romania. It is composed of a single village, named Moșteni.
