= Teleorman County =

County of Romania

Coordinates: 43°39′25″N 25°21′25″E

Teleorman County Județul Teleorman
- County
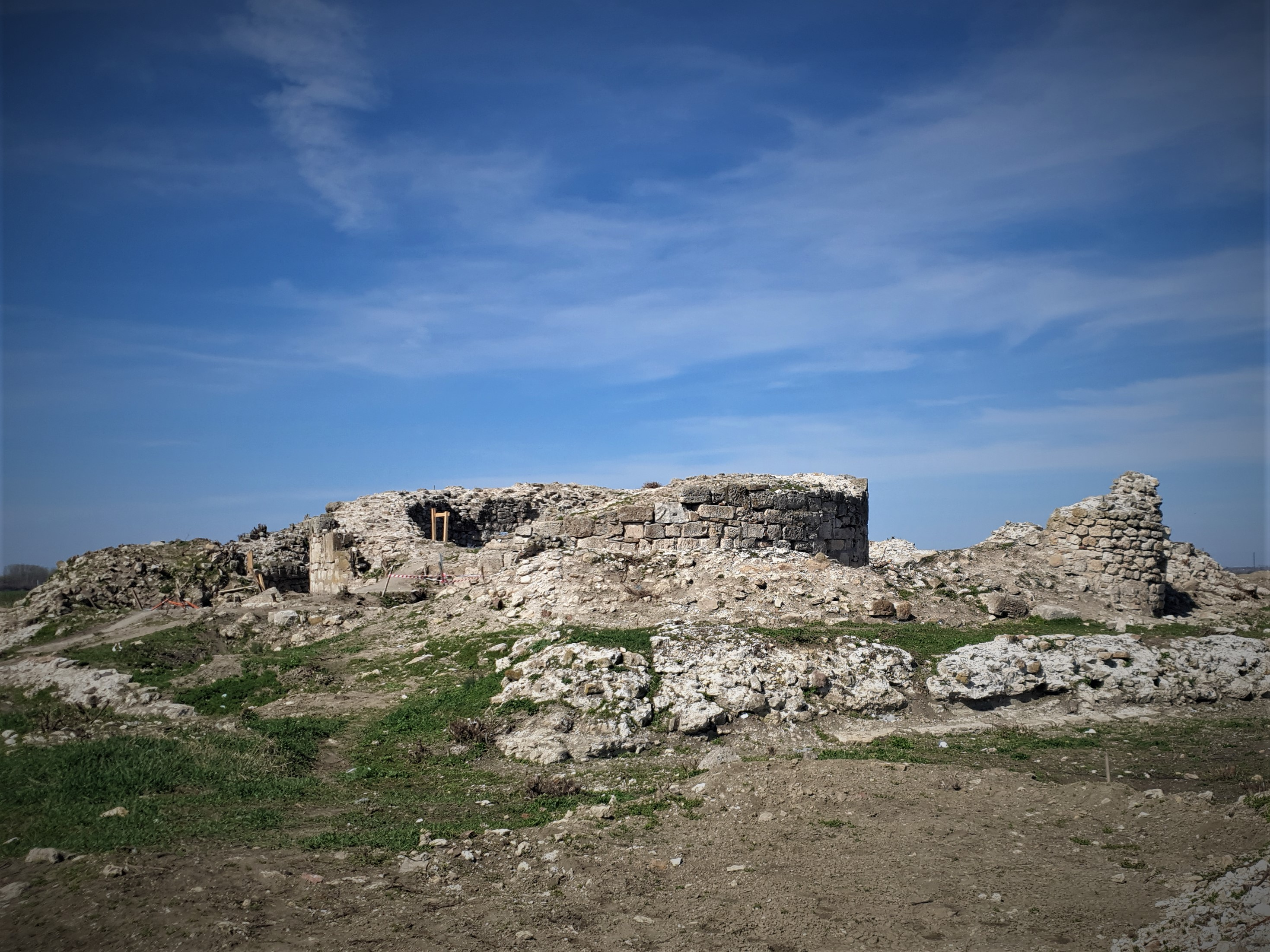
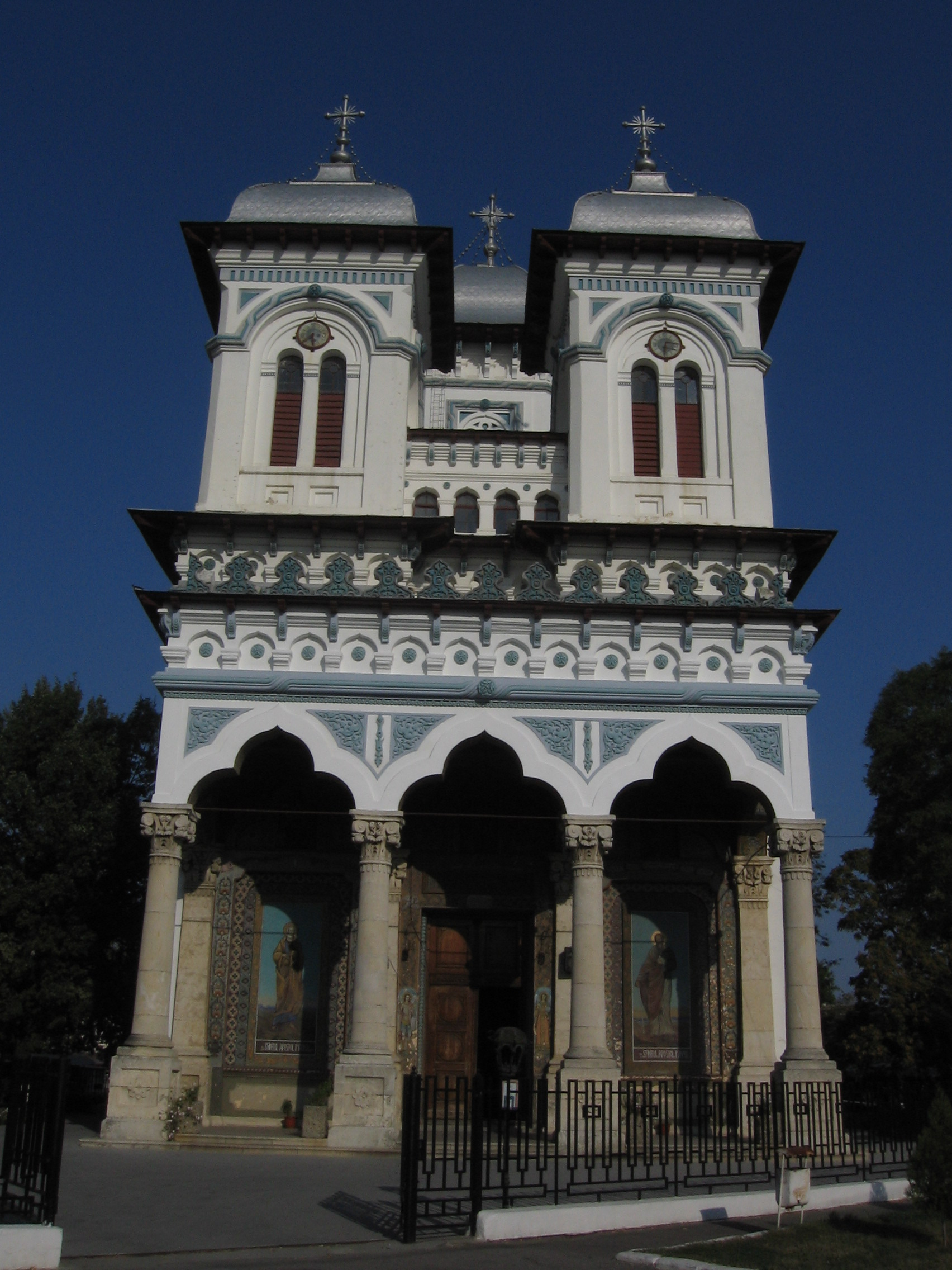
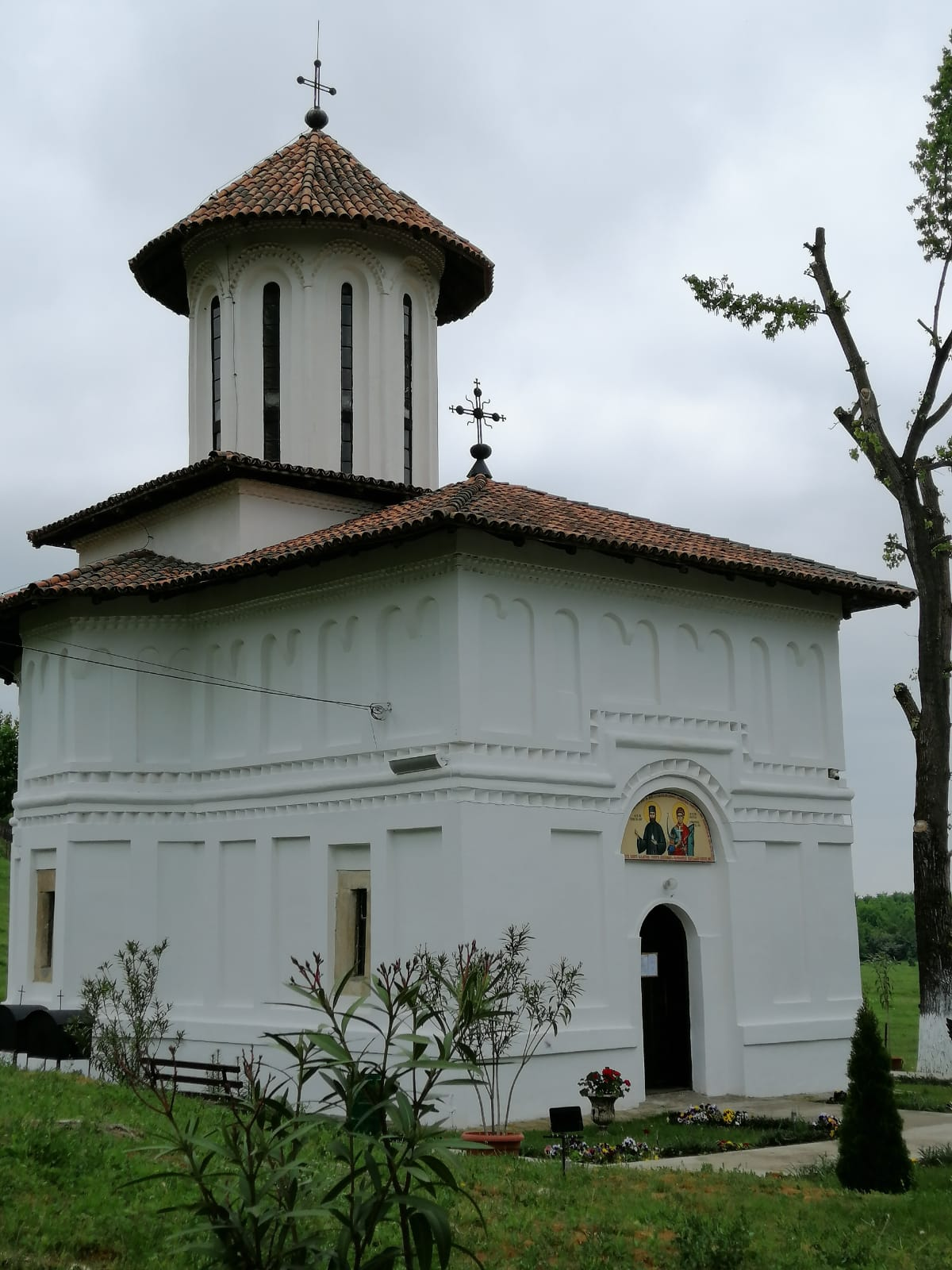
- Turnu Fortress St. Alexander Cathedral, Alexandria Coșoteni Monastery

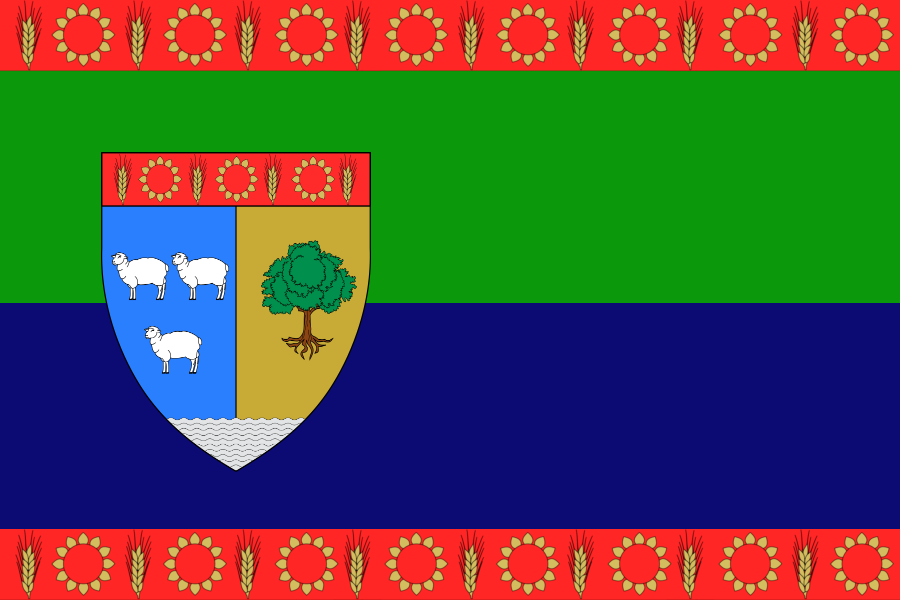
- Flag Coat of arms

- Country: Romania
- Development region: Sud
- Historical region: Muntenia
- Capital: Alexandria

Government
  - President of the County Board: Adrian Ionuţ Gâdea (PSD)
  - Prefect: Valentina-Veronica Mitran-Piticu

Area
  - Total: 5,790 km^{2} (2,240 sq mi)
  - Rank: 19th

Population (2021-12-01)
  - Total: 323,544
  - Rank: 24th
  - Density: 55.9/km^{2} (145/sq mi)
- Telephone code: (+40) 247 or (+40) 347
- ISO 3166 code: RO-TR (TR county)
- GDP (nominal): US$ 1.93 billion (2015)
- GDP per capita: US$ 6,315 (2015)
- Website: County Council County Prefecture

Teleorman County (Romanian pronunciation: [ˈtele.orman]) is a county (județ) of Romania on the border with Bulgaria, in the historical region Muntenia, with its capital city at Alexandria.

The name Teleorman is of Cumanic (Turkic) origin. It literally means wild/crazy forest (modern Turkish, Deli orman) and, by extension, "thick and shadowy forest" in the Cuman language. It can be encountered in other toponyms, such as the Turkish name of the Ludogorie Plateau in northeastern Bulgaria, Deliorman.

== Demographics ==
In 2021, the county had a population of 323,544 and the population density was 55.88/km^{2} (144.73/sq mi).

- Romanians – 87.35%
- Roma – 2.92%
- Bulgarians – 0.01%
- Others – 0.06%
- Unknown – 9.66%

Year	County population
1948	487,394
1956	510,488 ▲
1966	516,222 ▲
1977	518,943 ▲
1992	482,281 ▼
2002	436,025 ▼
2011	360,178 ▼
2021	323,544 ▼

== Geography ==
Teleorman County has a total area of 5,790 square kilometres (2,240 sq mi).

Two distinctive elements can be found:

- In the North and center there are plains from the Romanian Plain. They are separated by small rivers, which sometimes form deep valleys.
- In the South there is the Danube valley, very wide, with ponds and small channels.

Beside the Danube, the main river crossing the county is the Olt River which flows into the Danube close to the village of Islaz. Other important rivers are: the Vedea River, the Teleorman River, and the Călmățui River.

=== Neighbours ===
- Giurgiu County to the east.
- Olt County to the west.
- Argeș County and Dâmbovița County to the North.
- Bulgaria to the South – Veliko Tarnovo Province, Pleven Province, and Ruse Province.

== Economy ==
The predominant industries in the county are:

- Food and beverages industry.
- Textile industry.
- Chemical industry.
- Mechanical components industry; in Alexandria there is a big roll-bearing enterprise.

Agriculture is the main occupation in the county. Both extensive agriculture, and small scale — vegetables and fruits for the Bucharest markets — is practiced. The area is well suited for irrigations.

== Tourism ==
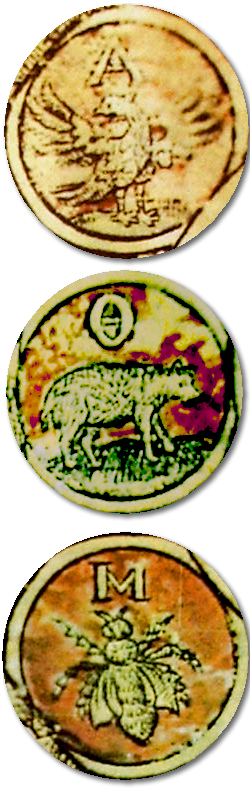
1715 coat of arms of Argeș, Teleorman, and Mehedinți counties on the frontispice of the Antim Monastery

The county doesn't have many attractions, but its cultural folk heritage is rich. Many Romanian personalities have been born here, some of them later describing the life in a village in a very picturesque way. Also, the area was one of the places where the Wallachian Revolution of 1848 unfolded.

The main tourist destinations are:

- The city of Alexandria.
- Fishing on the Danube and other lakes or ponds.

== Politics ==
The Teleorman County Council, renewed at the 2024 local elections, consists of 30 councilors, with the following party composition:

Party	Seats	Current County Council
Social Democratic Party (PSD)	18	
National Liberal Party (PNL)	9	
Alliance for the Union of Romanians (AUR)	3	

== Administrative divisions ==
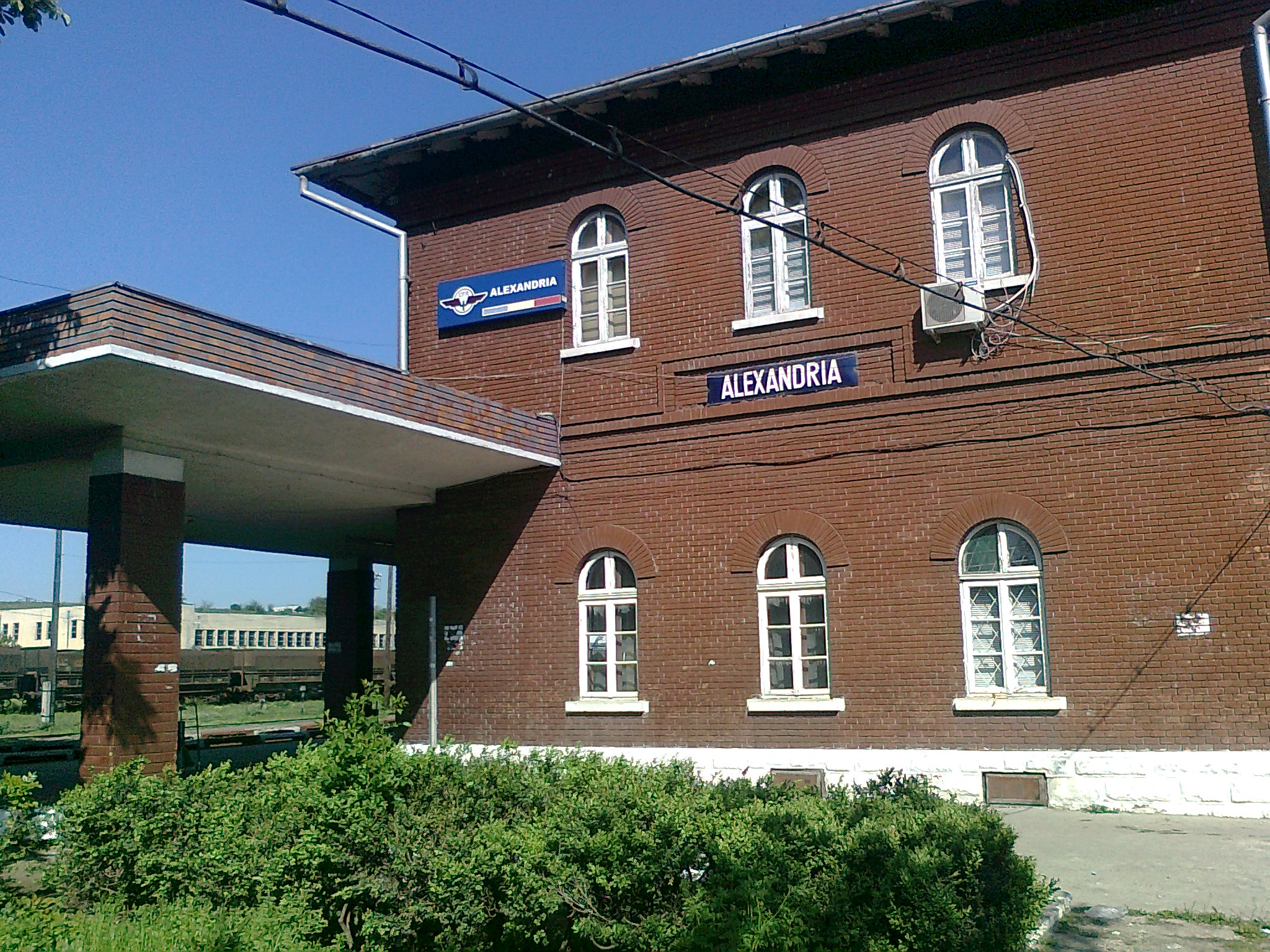
Alexandria

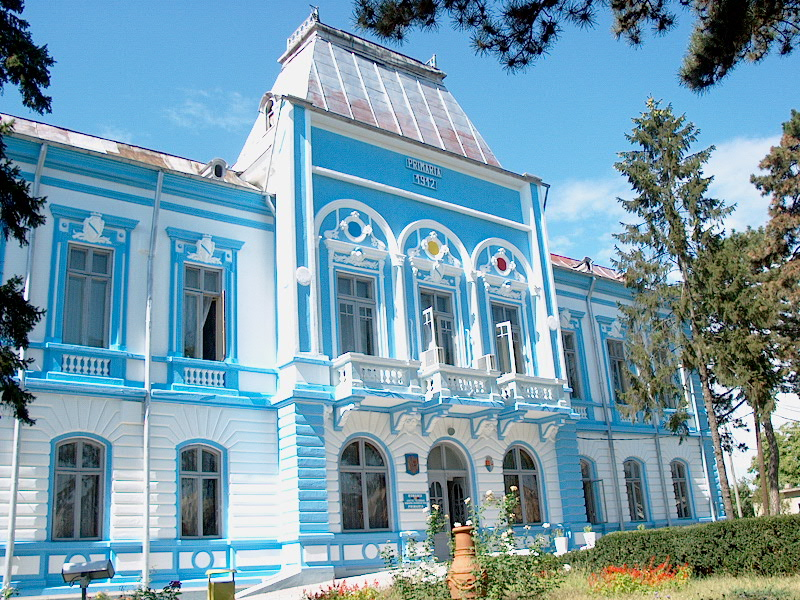
Roșiorii de Vede

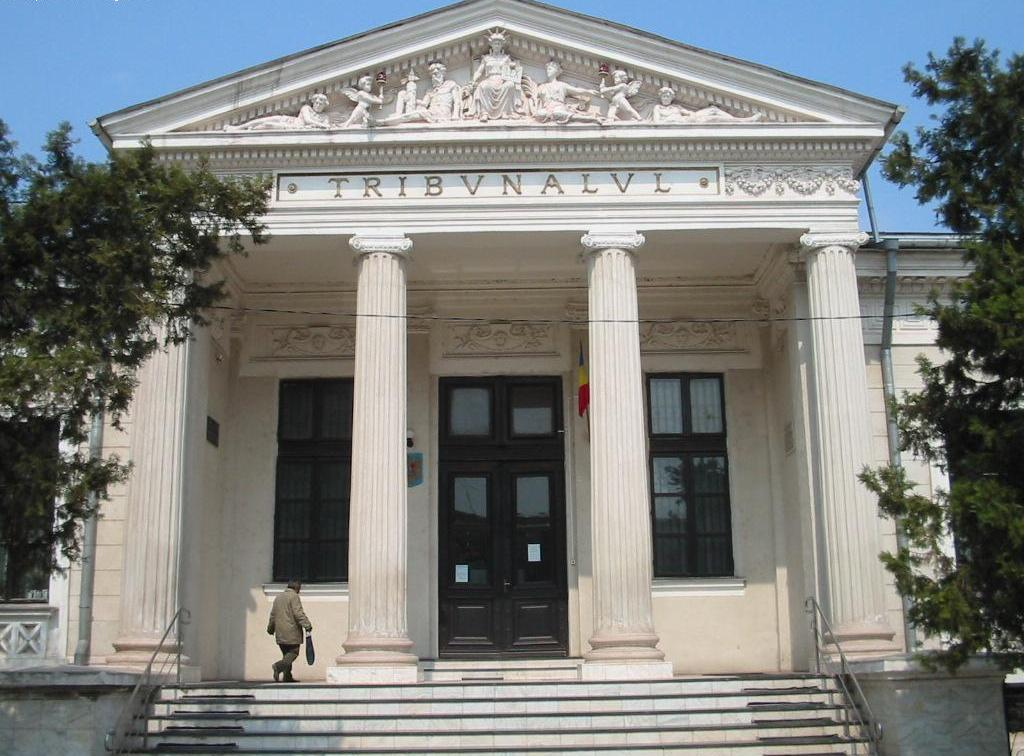
Turnu Măgurele

Teleorman County has 3 municipalities, 2 towns and 92 communes

Municipalities

- Alexandria - capital city; population: 42,129 (as of 2011)
- Roșiorii de Vede
- Turnu Măgurele

Towns

- Videle
- Zimnicea - the southernmost locality in Romania

Communes

- Băbăița
- Balaci
- Beciu
- Beuca
- Blejești
- Bogdana
- Botoroaga
- Bragadiru
- Brânceni
- Bujoreni
- Bujoru
- Buzescu
- Călinești
- Călmățuiu
- Călmățuiu de Sus
- Cervenia
- Ciolănești
- Ciuperceni
- Conțești
- Cosmești
- Crângu
- Crevenicu
- Crângeni
- Didești
- Dobrotești
- Dracea
- Drăcșenei
- Drăgănești de Vede
- Drăgănești-Vlașca
- Fântânele
- Frăsinet
- Frumoasa
- Furculești
- Gălăteni
- Gratia
- Islaz
- Izvoarele
- Lisa
- Lița
- Lunca
- Măgura
- Măldăeni
- Mârzănești
- Mavrodin
- Mereni
- Moșteni
- Nanov
- Năsturelu
- Necșești
- Nenciulești
- Olteni
- Orbeasca
- Peretu
- Piatra
- Pietroșani
- Plopii-Slăvitești
- Plosca
- Poeni
- Poroschia
- Purani
- Putineiu
- Rădoiești
- Răsmirești
- Săceni
- Saelele
- Salcia
- Sârbeni
- Scrioaștea
- Scurtu Mare
- Seaca
- Segarcea-Vale
- Sfințești
- Siliștea
- Siliștea Gumești
- Slobozia Mândra
- Smârdioasa
- Stejaru
- Ștorobăneasa
- Suhaia
- Talpa
- Tătărăștii de Jos
- Tătărăștii de Sus
- Țigănești
- Traian
- Trivalea-Moșteni
- Troianul
- Uda-Clocociov
- Vârtoape
- Vedea
- Viișoara
- Vitănești
- Zâmbreasca

== People ==
Natives of Teleorman County include:

- Marin Preda
- Zaharia Stancu
- Gala Galaction
- Constantin Noica
- Victor Antonescu
- Anghel Demetrescu

== Historical county ==
Județul Teleorman
- County (Județ)
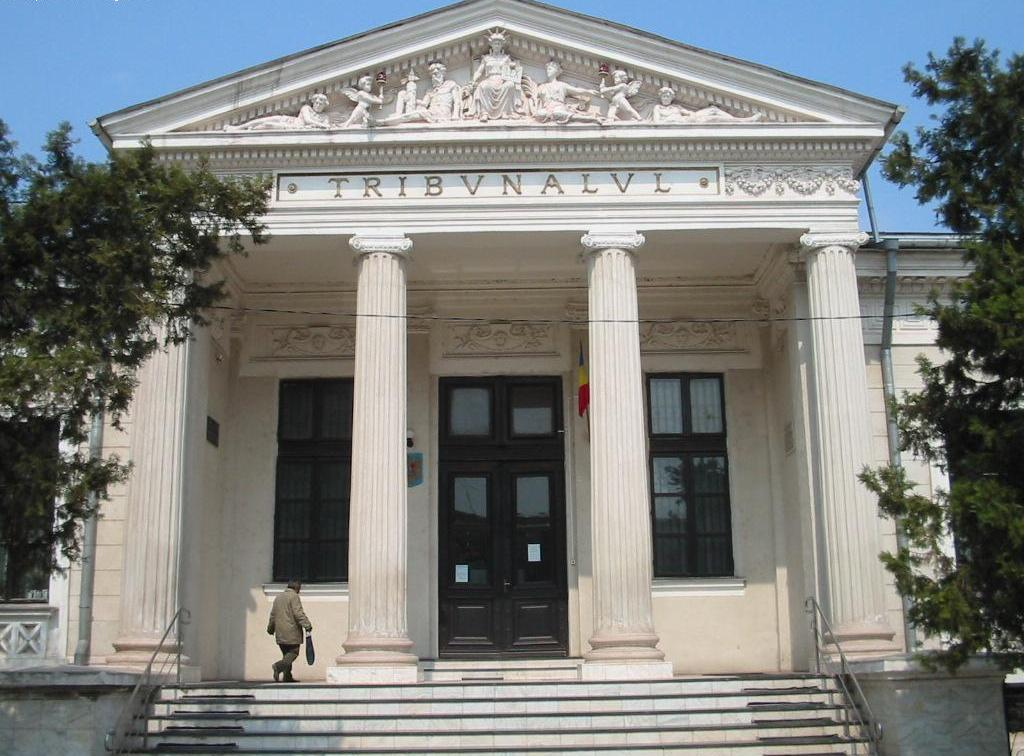
- The Teleorman County court building of the interwar period, currently the Turnu Măgurele city court building.

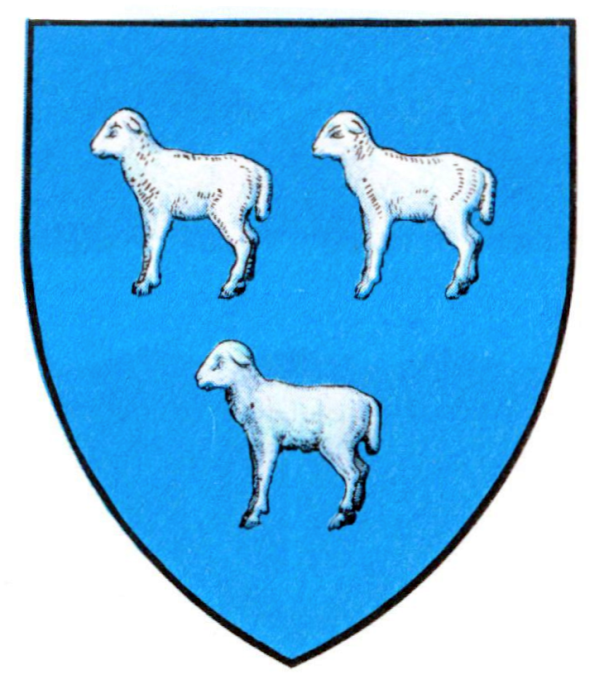
- Coat of arms

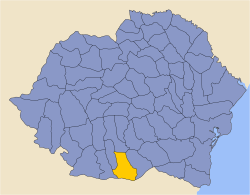
- Country: Romania
- Historic region: Muntenia
- Capital city (Reședință de județ): Turnu Măgurele

Area
  - Total: 4,577 km^{2} (1,767 sq mi)

Population (1930)
  - Total: 347,294
  - Density: 75.88/km^{2} (196.5/sq mi)
- Time zone: UTC+2 (EET)
  - Summer (DST): UTC+3 (EEST)

Historically, the county was located in the southern part of Greater Romania, in the southwestern part of the historical region of Muntenia. Its capital was Turnu Măgurele. The county was bordered on the west by the counties Romanați County and Olt County, to the north by Argeș County, to the east by Vlașca County, and in the south across the Danube River by the Kingdom of Bulgaria. Its territory coincides in large part with that of the present county.

=== Administration ===
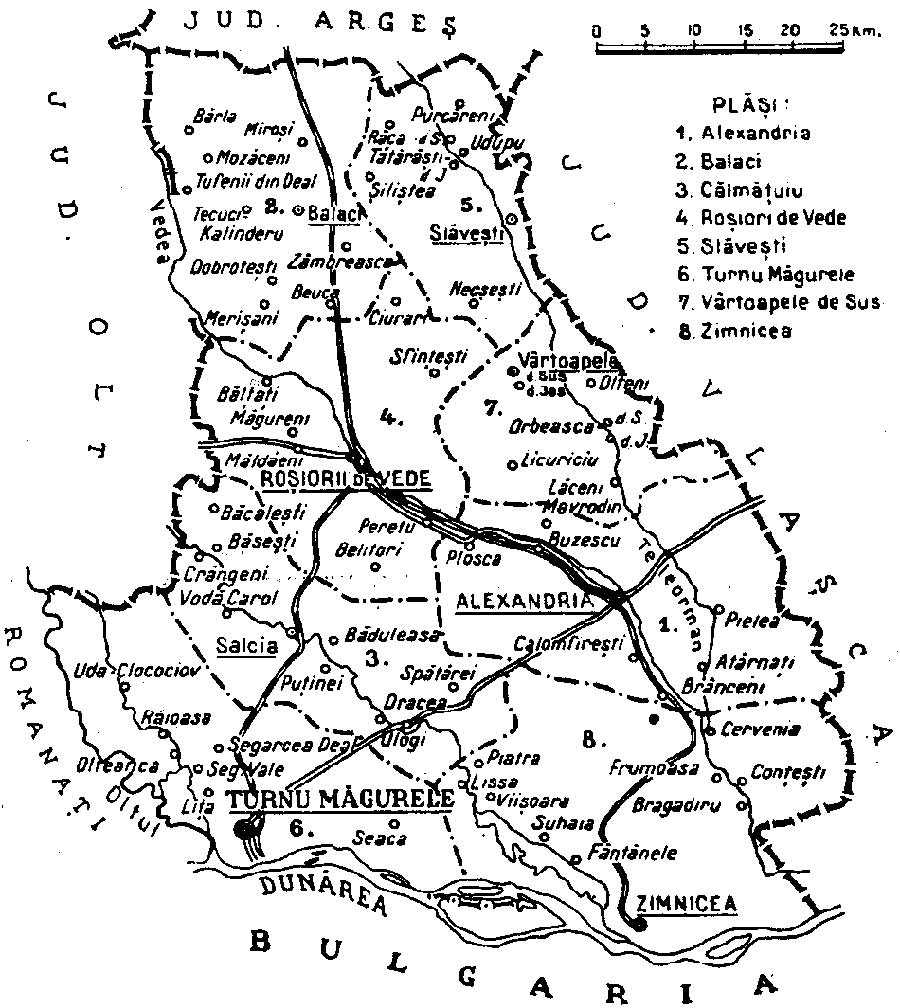
Map of Teleorman County as constituted in 1938.

The county was originally divided into five administrative districts (plăși):

1. Plasa Alexandria, headquartered at Alexandria
2. Plasa Balaci, headquartered at Balaci
3. Plasa Roșiori de Vede, headquartered at Roșiori de Vede
4. Plasa Turnu Măgurele, headquartered at Turnu Măgurele
5. Plasa Zimnicea, headquartered at Zimnicea

Subsequently, the county established three more districts:

6. Plasa Călmățuiu, headquartered at Călmățuiu
7. Plasa Slăvești, headquartered at Slăvești
8. Plasa Vârtoapele de Sus, headquartered at Vârtoapele de Sus

The county contained four urban communes: Turnu Măgurele, Alexandria, Roșiorii de Vede, and Zimnicea.

=== Population ===
According to the 1930 census data, the county population was 347,294 inhabitants, ethnically divided as follows: 98.1% Romanians, 1.4% Romanies, as well as other minorities. From the religious point of view, the population was 99.0% Eastern Orthodox, 0.6% Adventist, 0.1% Muslim, as well as other minorities.

==== Urban population ====
In 1930, the county's urban population was 58,632 inhabitants, comprising 94.4% Romanians, 3.3% Romanies, 0.4% Hungarians, 0.4% Jews, as well as other minorities. From the religious point of view, the urban population was composed of 98.1% Eastern Orthodox, 0.6% Muslim, 0.4% Jewish, 0.4% Roman Catholic, as well as other minorities.
