= Bogdana, Teleorman =

Bogdana
- Commune
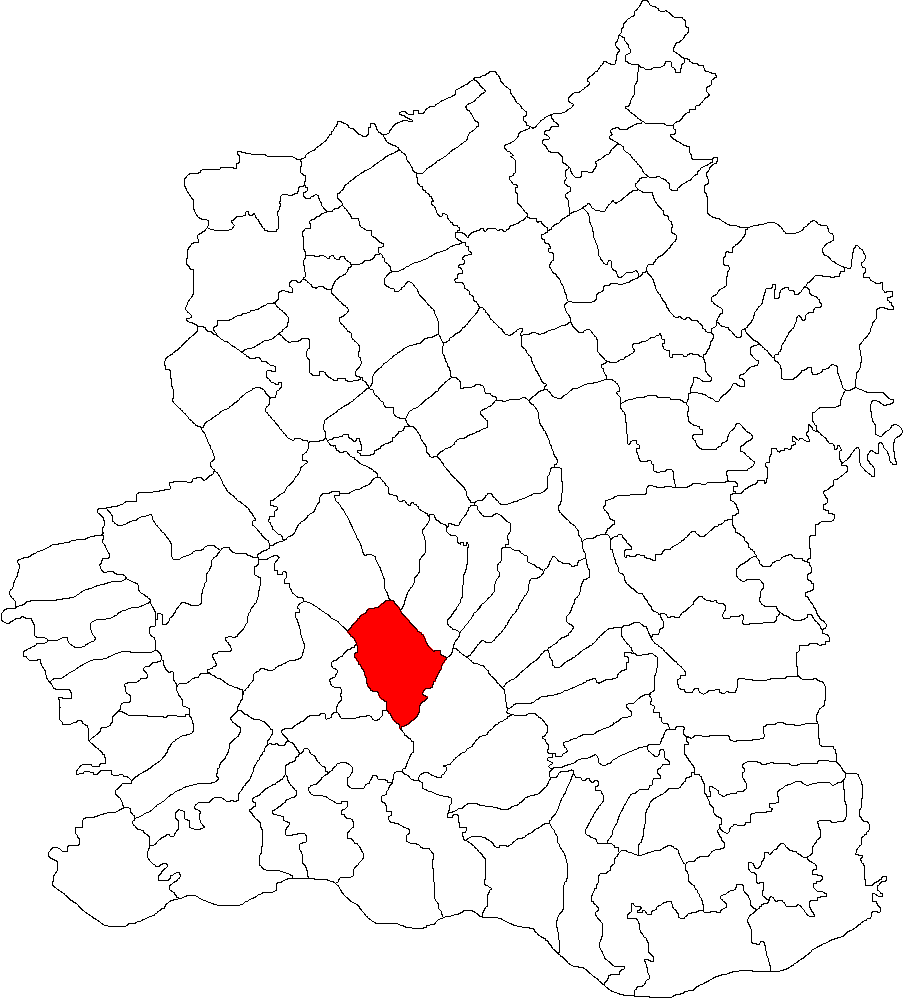
- Location in Teleorman County

- Location in Romania
- Coordinates: 43°56′N 25°05′E
- Country: Romania
- County: Teleorman
- Subdivisions: Bogdana, Broșteanca, Ulmeni, Urluiu
- Population (2021-12-01): 1,948
- Time zone: EET/EEST (UTC+2/+3)
- Vehicle reg.: TR

Bogdana (Romanian pronunciation: [boɡˈdana]) is a commune in Teleorman County, Muntenia, Romania. It is composed of four villages: Bogdana, Broșteanca, Ulmeni and Urluiu.
