= Furculești =

- Commune
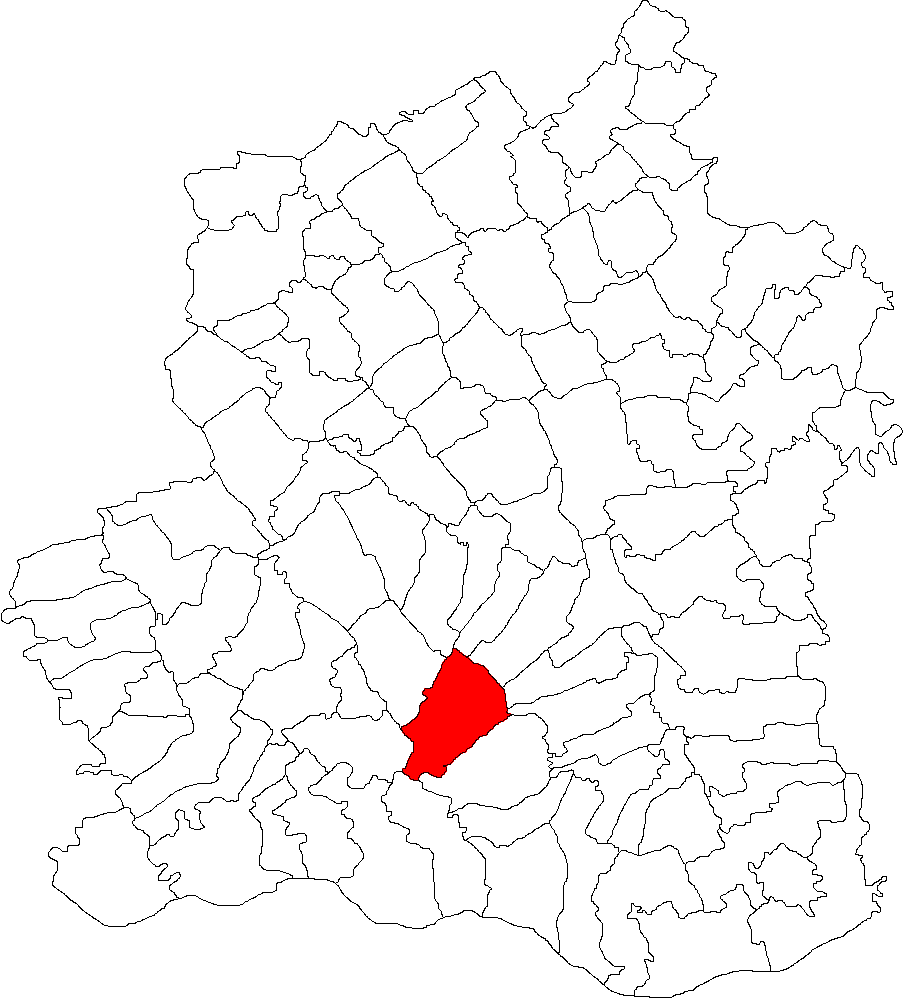
- Location in Teleorman County

- Location in Romania
- Coordinates: 43°52′N 25°09′E
- Country: Romania
- County: Teleorman
- Subdivisions: Furculești, Moșteni, Spătărei, Voievoda
- Population (2021-12-01): 2,915
- Time zone: EET/EEST (UTC+2/+3)
- Vehicle reg.: TR

Furculești (Romanian pronunciation: [furkuˈleʃtʲ]) is a commune in Teleorman County, Muntenia, Romania. It is composed of four villages: Furculești, Moșteni, Spătărei and Voievoda.

== Natives ==
- Gheorghe Băgulescu (1886–1963), brigadier general in World War II
