= List of rivers of Romania: P =

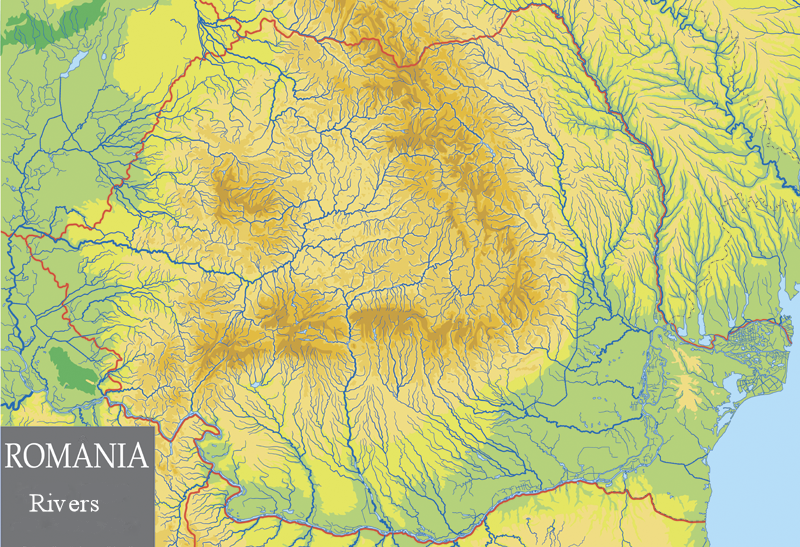
Map of Romania's hydrographic network

== P ==
River	Tributary of
Pădurani	Bunea
Pădureni	Râul Negru]
Păiș	Jijioara
Paloș	Homorodul Mare
Păltiniș	Bâsca
Pământ Alb	Apa Mare
Pănade	Târnava Mică
Pănicel	Sohodol
Păpăuți	Covasna
Parapanca	Danube
Părău	Olt
Pârâu	Valea Nouă
Pârâul Alb	Feneș
Pârâul Băilor	Someșul Mare
Pârâul Băutor	Târnava Mare
Pârâul Boului	Moldovița
Pârâul Câinelui	Vedea
Pârâul Cheii	Pârâul Mic
Pârâul Chintenilor	Someșul Mic
Pârâul de Câmp	Râul Galben
Pârâul de Câmpie	Mureș
Pârâul Domnului	Holod
Pârâul Fierului	Râul Galben
Pârâul Florilor	Arieș
Pârâul Galben	Gilort
Pârâul Grecilor	Cârcinov
Pârâul Întors	Buhai
Pârâul lui Martin	Jijia
Pârâul lui Vasile	Miletin
Pârâul Mare	Mureș
Pârâul Mărului	Putna
Pârâul Mic	Ghimbășel
Pârâul Mijlociu	Geamărtălui

River	Tributary of
Pârâul Morii	Ier
Pârâul Nou	Olt
Pârâul Ocnei	Someșul Mic
Pârâul Omului	Crișul Repede
Pârâul Pietros	Vișeu
Pârâul Primejdios	Cașin
Pârâul Rece	Timiș
Pârâul Roșu	Olteț
Pârâul Sărat	Olt
Pârâul Sec	Olt
Pârâul Țarinii	Crișul Negru
Pârâul Țigăncilor	Siret
Pârâul Urșanilor	Luncavăț
Pârâul Vinului	Bistricioara
Paroș	Strei
Pasărea	Dâmbovița
Pasărea	Danube
Pasărea	Parapanca
Pășcănia	Bahlueț
Păscoaia	Lotru
Pâscov	Ialomița
Pătac	Bâsca
Peceneaga	Danube
Pecineaga	Slănic
Peleș	Prahova
Perchiu	Polocin
Pereschiv	Bârlad
Pereschivul Mic	Pereschiv
Periac	Suciu
Perișani	Suhu
Pesceana	Olt
Peșteana	Motru
Peșteana	Olteț
Peșteana	Tismana

River	Tributary of
Peștera	Danube
Peștiș	Cerna
Peștiș	Mureș
Peța	Crișul Repede
Petic	Zăbala
Petrilaca	Mureș
Petrind	Almaș
Petriș	Mureș
Pianul	Mureș
Piatra	Mureș
Pietroasa	Sărata
Pietrosul	Mureș
Pintic	Dipșa
Plai	Mureș
Plăiești	Arieș
Plapcea	Vedea
Plapcea Mică	Plapcea
Pleșa	Timiș
Plescioara	Jaleș
Plosca	Amaradia
Ploștina	Motru
Ploștini	Albac
Pluton-Dolhești	Neamț
Poarta	Turcu
Pocloș	Mureș
Poclușa	Crișul Negru
Podriga	Bașeu
Pogăniș	Timiș
Poiana	Someș
Poiana	Topa
Poicu	Crișul Repede
Poienari	Prahova
Poienița	Amaradia
Polatiștea	Jiu
Polocin	Siret

River	Tributary of
Poneasca	Miniș
Ponița	Crasna
Ponoară	Corogea
Popeni	Trotuș
Popești	Nadăș
Poplița	Bâsca
Porcu	Jiu
Porumbacu	Olt
Poșaga	Arieș
Potoc	Crișul Alb
Potop	Sabar
Potopin	Teslui
Pozen	Suceava
Prahova	Ialomița
Prăvăleni	Crișul Alb
Pria	Crasna
Priboiasa	Păscoaia
Prigoana	Sebeș
Prigor	Nera
Printre Văi	Almaș
Prisăcina	Cerna
Prislop	Doftana
Provița	Cricovul Dulce
Prut	Danube
Pruteț	Prut
Purcari	Gilort
Purcaru	Doftana
Pusta	Crișul Negru
Pustnic	Olt
Putna	Bistricioara
Putna	Moldova
Putna	Siret
Putna	Suceava
Putnișoara	Putna
Putreda	Jijia
