= Almaș (Someș) =

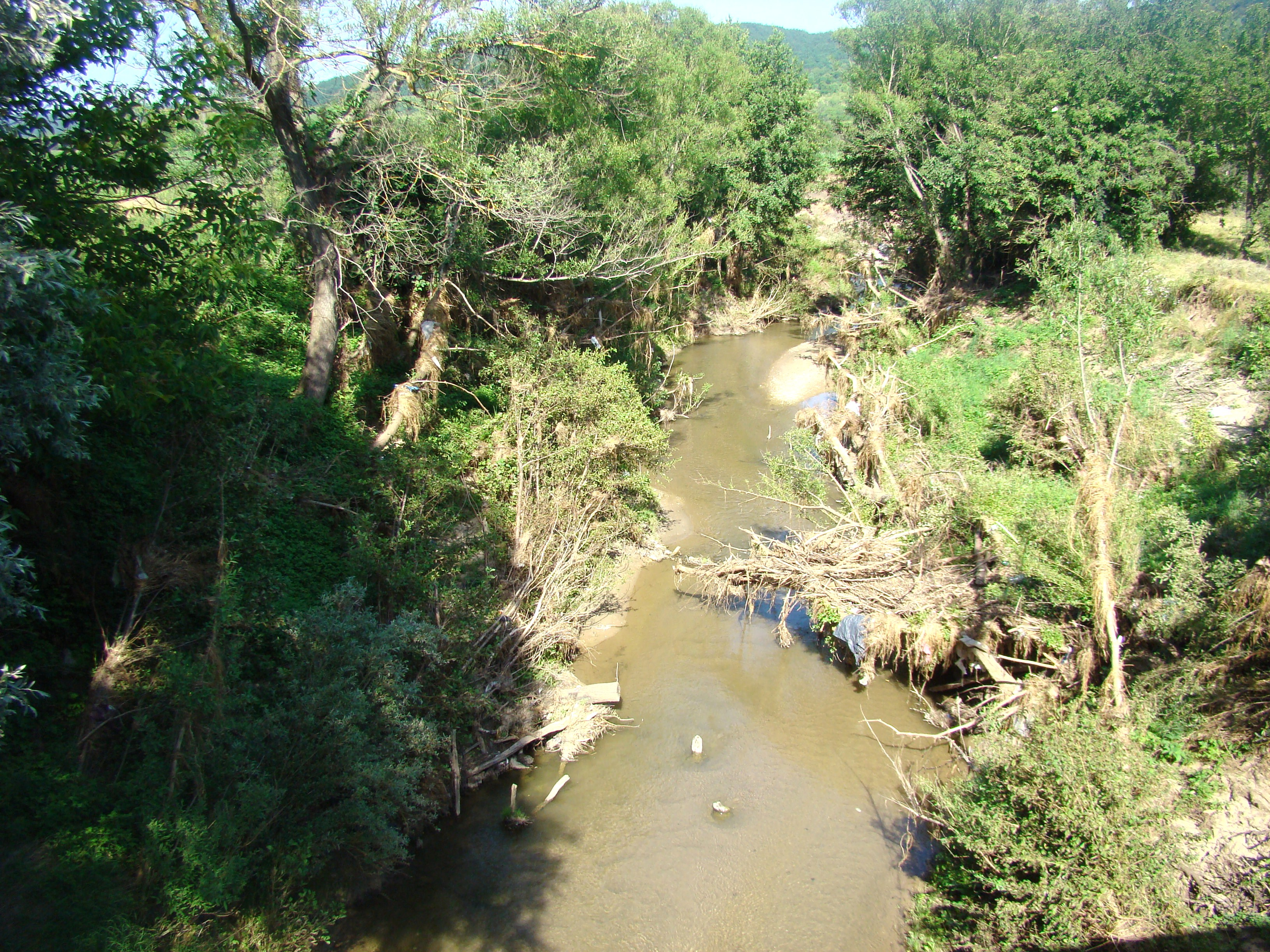

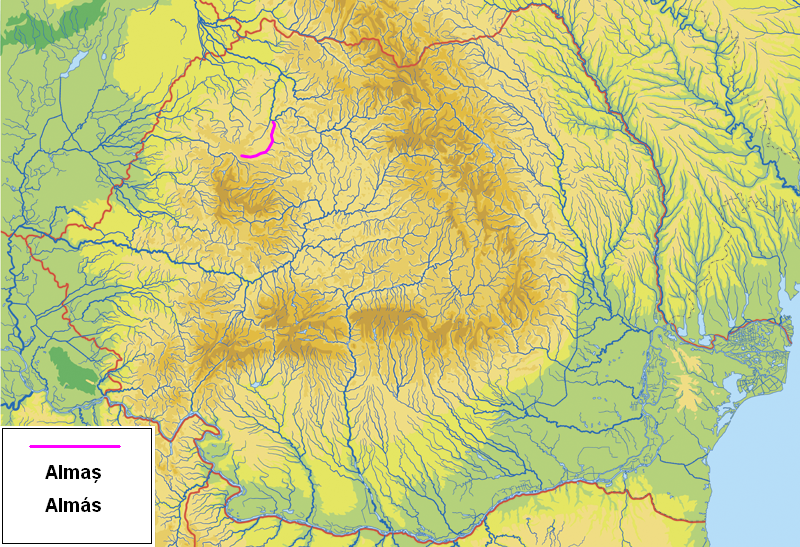

Location
- Country: Romania
- Counties: Sălaj County
- Communes: Fildu de Jos, Almașu, Cuzăplac, Zimbor, Sânmihaiu Almașului, Hida, Bălan, Surduc

Physical characteristics
- Source: near Fildu de Sus
- Mouth: Someș
  - location: Turbuța
  - coordinates: 47.2447°N 23.3092°E
- Length: 68 km (42 mi)
- Basin size: 384 km^{2} (148 sq mi)

Basin features
- Progression: Someș→ Tisza→ Danube→ Black Sea

The Almaș (Hungarian: Almás-patak) is a left tributary of the river Someș in Romania. It discharges into the Someș in Var near Jibou. Its length is 68 km (42 mi) and its basin size is 384 km^{2} (148 sq mi). The name of the river means "apple + "s" as an adjective suffix" in the Hungarian language.

== Tributaries ==
The following rivers are tributaries to the river Almaș:

- Left: Băbiu, Guiaga, Meștereaga, Benaia, Mierța, Sântă Măria, Jirnău
- Right: Peștera, Dorogna, Jebuc, Valea Cetății, Petrind, Bozolnic, Sâncraiul Almașului, Dolu, Ugruțiu, Dragu, Printre Văi, Trestia
