= Pasărea =

Pasărea may refer to the following places in Romania:

- Pasărea, a village in Frumușani Commune, Călărași County
- Pasărea, a village in Brănești Commune, Ilfov County
- Pasărea, a tributary of the Cernat in Buzău County
- Pasărea (Dâmbovița), a tributary of the Dâmbovița in Ilfov and Călărași Counties
- Pasărea (Danube), a tributary of the Danube in Teleorman County
- Pasărea (Parapanca), a tributary of the Parapanca in Giurgiu County
