= Pietrișu =

Pietrişu may refer to several villages in Romania:

- Pietrişu, a village in Găujani Commune, Giurgiu County
- Pietrişu, a village in Curtișoara Commune, Olt County
- Pietrişu, a village in Poiana Câmpina Commune, Prahova County
- Pietrişu, a village in the town of Băile Olăneşti, Vâlcea County

== Others ==
- Pietrișul Creek, a right tributary of the Mureş River in Romania

== See also ==
- Piatra (disambiguation)
- Pietriș (disambiguation)
- Pietreni (disambiguation)
- Pietrari (disambiguation)
- Pietrosu (disambiguation)
- Pietroasa (disambiguation)
- Pietroșani (disambiguation)
- Pietricica (disambiguation)
