= Piatra =

Piatra may refer to the following places:

In Romania:

- Piatra Neamț, a city in Neamț County
- Piatra-Olt, a town in Olt County
- Piatra, Teleorman, a commune in Teleorman County
- Piatra, a village in Brăduleț, Argeș County
- Piatra, a village in Ciofrângeni, Argeș County
- Piatra, a village in Stoenești, Argeș County
- Piatra, a village in Chiuza, Bistrița-Năsăud County
- Piatra, a village in Mihail Kogălniceanu, Constanța County
- Piatra, a village in Runcu, Dâmbovița County
- Piatra, a village in Bătrâna, Hunedoara County
- Piatra, a village in Remeți, Maramureș County
- Piatra, a village in Cocorăștii Colț, Prahova County
- Piatra, a village in Drajna, Prahova County
- Piatra, a village in Provița de Jos, Prahova County
- Piatra, a village in Ostrov, Tulcea County
- Piatra Albă, a village in Odăile, Buzău County
- Piatra Fântânele, a village in Tiha Bârgăului, Bistrița-Năsăud County
- Piatra Mică, a village in Sângeru, Prahova County
- Piatra Șoimului, a commune in Neamț County
- Piatra Craiului Mountains, a mountain range in the Southern Carpathians
- Piatra Mare Mountains, a small mountain range in Brașov County, southeast of Brașov, Romania
- Piatra (Mureș), a tributary of the Mureș in Harghita County
- Piatra, a tributary of the Negrișoara in Suceava County
- Piatra, a tributary of the Slănic in Bacău County

In Moldova:

- Piatra, Orhei, a commune in Orhei District
- Piatra Albă, a village in Mileștii Mici, Ialoveni District

== See also ==
- Pietriș (disambiguation)
- Pietreni (disambiguation)
- Pietrari (disambiguation)
- Pietrosu (disambiguation)
- Pietrișu (disambiguation)
- Pietroasa (disambiguation)
- Pietroșani (disambiguation)
- Pietricica (disambiguation)
- Pietroșița
- Petre (disambiguation)
