= Pasărea (Parapanca) =

- Location within Romania

Location
- Country: Romania
- Counties: Giurgiu County
- Villages: Pietrișu, Găujani, Vedea, Malu

Physical characteristics
- Mouth: Parapanca
  - coordinates: 43.8295°N 25.8312°E

Basin features
- Progression: Parapanca→ Danube→ Black Sea

The Pasărea is a right tributary of the river Parapanca in Romania that discharges into the Parapanca in Malu. Initially, it was a branch of the Danube linked to a branch of the river Vedea. During the embankment of the Danube flood plain in the 1960s, a new link canal was excavated linking the upper part of the old branch to the Danube, near the village of Pietroșani.

The present river acts as a drainage canal having a course parallel to Danube and collecting the inflow from the catchment area behind the embankment. The villages of Pietrişu, Găujani, Vedea and Malu are located on the banks of the Pasărea. It discharges into the river Parapanca, which flows into the Danube near Slobozia.
