= Gălășeni =

Gălăşeni may refer to:

- Gălăşeni, a village in Măgești Commune, Bihor County, Romania
- Gălăşeni, a village in Cuzăplac Commune, Sălaj County, Romania
- Gălăşeni, Rîşcani, a commune in Raionul Rîşcani, Moldova
