= Dragu (river) =

- Location within Romania

Location
- Country: Romania
- Counties: Sălaj County
- Villages: Dragu, Hida

Physical characteristics
- Mouth: Almaș
  - location: Hida
  - coordinates: 47.0684°N 23.3062°E
- Length: 12 km (7.5 mi)
- Basin size: 67 km^{2} (26 sq mi)

Basin features
- Progression: Almaș→ Someș→ Tisza→ Danube→ Black Sea
- Tributaries
  - right: Valea Adalin, Voivodeni

The Dragu is a tributary of the river Almaș in Romania. It flows into the Almaș in Hida. Its length is 12 km (7.5 mi) and its basin size is 67 km^{2} (26 sq mi).
