= Sâncraiul Almașului =

- Location within Romania

Location
- Country: Romania
- Counties: Sălaj County
- Villages: Sâncraiu Almașului, Sutoru

Physical characteristics
- Mouth: Almaș
  - location: Sutoru
  - coordinates: 46.9895°N 23.2519°E
- Length: 13 km (8.1 mi)
- Basin size: 33 km^{2} (13 sq mi)

Basin features
- Progression: Almaș→ Someș→ Tisza→ Danube→ Black Sea

The Sâncraiul Almașului is a right tributary of the river Almaș in Romania. It flows into the Almaș in Sutoru. Its length is 13 km (8.1 mi) and its basin size is 33 km^{2} (13 sq mi).
