= Pietroasa =

Pietroasa may refer to several places in Romania:

== Populated places ==
- Pietroasa, Bihor, a commune in Bihor County
- Pietroasa, Timiș, a commune in Timiș County
- Pietroasa, a village in Valea Mare-Pravăț Commune, Argeș County
- Pietroasa, a village in Moldovenești Commune, Cluj County
- Pietroasa, a village in Valea Mare Commune, Vâlcea County
- Pietroasa, a village in Bolotești Commune, Vrancea County
- Pietroasa, a village in Câmpineanca Commune, Vrancea County
- Pietroasa, a village in Tâmboești Commune, Vrancea County
- Pietroasa, a village in Vârteșcoiu Commune, Vrancea County
- Pietroasa, a district in the town of Broșteni, Suceava County

== Rivers ==
- Pietroasa, a tributary of the Apa Caldă in Cluj County
- Pietroasa, a tributary of the Bistra Mărului in Caraș-Severin County
- Pietroasa, a tributary of the Jiu in Gorj County
- Pietroasa, a tributary of the Jiul de Vest in Hunedoara County
- Pietroasa (Sărata), a tributary of the Sărata in Buzău County
- Pietroasa, a tributary of the Topa in Bihor County

== See also ==
- Piatra (disambiguation)
- Pietriș (disambiguation)
- Pietreni (disambiguation)
- Pietrari (disambiguation)
- Pietrosu (disambiguation)
- Pietrișu (disambiguation)
- Pietroșani (disambiguation)
- Pietricica (disambiguation)
