= Bozolnic =

- Location within Romania

Location
- Country: Romania
- Counties: Sălaj County

Physical characteristics
- Mouth: Almaș
  - location: near Cuzăplac
  - coordinates: 46.9747°N 23.2257°E
- Length: 11 km (6.8 mi)
- Basin size: 55 km^{2} (21 sq mi)

Basin features
- Progression: Almaș→ Someș→ Tisza→ Danube→ Black Sea
- Tributaries
  - left: Arghiș

The Bozolnic is a right tributary of the river Almaș in Romania. It flows into the Almaș near Cuzăplac. Its length is 11 km (6.8 mi) and its basin size is 55 km^{2} (21 sq mi).
