= Cubleș =

Cubleș may refer to:

- Cubleș, a tributary of the Holod in Bihor County, Romania
- Cubleșu, a village in the commune Cuzăplac, Sălaj County, Romania
