= Sântă Măria =

- Location within Romania

Location
- Country: Romania
- Counties: Sălaj County
- Villages: Bercea, Sântă Măria, Sânmihaiu Almașului

Physical characteristics
- Mouth: Almaș
  - location: Sânmihaiu Almașului
  - coordinates: 47.0414°N 23.2861°E
- Length: 13 km (8.1 mi)
- Basin size: 61 km^{2} (24 sq mi)

Basin features
- Progression: Almaș→ Someș→ Tisza→ Danube→ Black Sea
- Tributaries
  - left: Valea Mare

The Sântă Măria is a left tributary of the river Almaș in Romania. It flows into the Almaș in Sânmihaiu Almașului. Its length is 13 km (8.1 mi) and its basin size is 61 km^{2} (24 sq mi).
