= Mierea =

Mierea may refer to several villages in Romania:

- Mierea, a village in Vernești Commune, Buzău County
- Mierea, a village in Crușeț Commune, Gorj County
- Mierea, a village in Ghioroiu Commune, Vâlcea County
