= Pietreni =

Pietreni may refer to several villages in Romania:

- Pietreni, a village in Deleni Commune, Constanța County
- Pietreni, a village in Costești Commune, Vâlcea County

== See also ==
- Piatra (disambiguation)
- Pietriș (disambiguation)
- Pietrari (disambiguation)
- Pietrosu (disambiguation)
- Pietrișu (disambiguation)
- Pietroasa (disambiguation)
- Pietroșani (disambiguation)
- Pietricica (disambiguation)
