= Pietrosul (disambiguation) =

Pietrosul may refer to the following rivers in Romania:

- Pietrosul, a tributary of the Mureș in Harghita County
- Pietrosul, a tributary of the Siret in Iași County
- Pietrosul, a tributary of the Sulța in Bacău County
- Pietrosul, a tributary of the Tazlăul Sărat in Bacău County

== See also ==
- Pietrosu (disambiguation)
- Pârâul Pietros (disambiguation)
