= Pârâul Sărat =

Pârâul Sărat may refer to:

- Pârâul Sărat, a tributary of the Bâsca Mică in Buzău County
- Pârâul Sărat, a tributary of the Olt in Brașov County
- Pârâul Sărat (Vâlcea), a tributary of the Olt in Vâlcea County
- Pârâul Sărat, a tributary of the Ozunca in Covasna County
- Pârâul Sărat, a tributary of the Netezi in Neamț County
- Pârâul Sărat, a tributary of the Târnava Mare in Harghita County
