= Corogea =

- Location within Romania

Location
- Country: Romania
- Counties: Botoșani County
- Villages: Dobârceni, Cucuteni, Sărata

Physical characteristics
- Mouth: Prut
  - coordinates: 47.6663°N 27.2926°E
- Length: 32 km (20 mi)
- Basin size: 191 km^{2} (74 sq mi)
- Discharge
  - location: *
  - minimum: 0.002 m^{3}/s (0.071 cu ft/s)
  - maximum: 180 m^{3}/s (6,400 cu ft/s)

Basin features
- Progression: Prut→ Danube→ Black Sea
- Tributaries
  - right: Ponoară, Rânghilești

The Corogea is a right tributary of the river Prut in Romania. It discharges into the Prut near Ilișeni, on the border with Moldova. Its length is 32 km (20 mi) and its basin size is 191 km^{2} (74 sq mi).
