= Pietriș =

Pietriș may refer to:

Geography

- Pietriș, a village in Dolhești Commune, Iași County, Romania
- Pietriș, a village in Deda Commune, Mureș County, Romania
- Pietriș, a village in Baldovinești Commune, Olt County, Romania
- Pietriș, a tributary of the Tinoasa in Romania
- Pârâul cu Pietriș, a tributary of the Ghimbav in Romania
- Valea cu Pietriș, a tributary of the Izvorul Dorului in Romania

Surname

- Bogdan Pietriș (1945–2006), Romanian painter

== See also ==
- Piatra (disambiguation)
- Pietreni (disambiguation)
- Pietrari (disambiguation)
- Pietrosu (disambiguation)
- Pietrișu (disambiguation)
- Pietroasa (disambiguation)
- Pietroșani (disambiguation)
- Pietricica (disambiguation)
