= Ciucă =

Ciucă is a Romanian surname. Notable people with the surname include:

- Diana Ciucă (born 2000), Romanian handball player
- Eugen Ciucă (1913–2005), Romanian-American artist
- Mihai Ciucă (1883–1969), Romanian bacteriologist and parasitologist
- Nicolae Ciucă (born 1967), Romanian general and politician
