= Pietrari =

Pietrari is a common Romanian name and may refer to several places in Romania:

- Pietrari, a commune in Dâmbovița County
- Pietrari, a commune in Vâlcea County, and its village of Pietrarii de Sus
- Pietrari, a village in Păușești-Măglași Commune, Vâlcea County

== See also ==
- Piatra (disambiguation)
- Pietriș (disambiguation)
- Pietreni (disambiguation)
- Pietrosu (disambiguation)
- Pietrișu (disambiguation)
- Pietroasa (disambiguation)
- Pietroșani (disambiguation)
- Pietricica (disambiguation)
