= Pietroșani =

Pietroşani may refer to several places:

- Pietroşani, a commune in Argeș County
- Pietroşani, a commune in Teleorman County
- Pietroşani, a village in Puchenii Mari Commune, Prahova County

== See also ==
- Petroșani, a city in Hunedoara County, Romania
- Piatra (disambiguation)
- Pietriș (disambiguation)
- Pietreni (disambiguation)
- Pietrari (disambiguation)
- Pietrosu (disambiguation)
- Pietrișu (disambiguation)
- Pietroasa (disambiguation)
- Pietricica (disambiguation)
