= Pietricica =

Pietricica may refer to:

- Pietricica, a village in Lapoș Commune, Prahova County, Romania
- Pietricica River, a tributary of the Ialomicioara River in Romania

== See also ==
- Piatra (disambiguation)
- Pietriș (disambiguation)
- Pietreni (disambiguation)
- Pietrari (disambiguation)
- Pietrosu (disambiguation)
- Pietrișu (disambiguation)
- Pietroasa (disambiguation)
- Pietroșani (disambiguation)
