= Jebuc =

- Location within Romania

Location
- Country: Romania
- Counties: Sălaj County
- Villages: Jebucu, Sfăraș

Physical characteristics
- Mouth: Almaș
  - coordinates: 46.9350°N 23.1128°E
- Length: 9 km (5.6 mi)
- Basin size: 40 km^{2} (15 sq mi)

Basin features
- Progression: Almaș→ Someș→ Tisza→ Danube→ Black Sea
- Tributaries
  - left: Martin

The Jebuc is a right tributary of the river Almaș in Romania. It flows into the Almaș near the village Almașu. Its length is 9 km (5.6 mi) and its basin size is 40 km^{2} (15 sq mi).
