= Sânmihaiu =

Sânmihaiu or Sânmihai ("Saint Michael") may refer to several places in Romania:

- Sânmihaiu Almașului, a commune in Sălaj County
- Sânmihaiu de Câmpie, a commune in Bistrița-Năsăud County
- Sânmihaiu Român, a commune in Timiș County, and its village of Sânmihaiu German
- Sânmihai de Pădure, a village in Beica de Jos Commune, Mureș County
- Sânmihaiu, the former name of Mihai Viteazu Commune, Cluj County
