= Băbiu =

- Location within Romania

Location
- Country: Romania
- Counties: Sălaj County
- Villages: Mesteacănu, Băbiu

Physical characteristics
- Mouth: Almaș
  - location: Almașu
  - coordinates: 46.9451°N 23.1344°E
- Length: 17 km (11 mi)
- Basin size: 70 km^{2} (27 sq mi)

Basin features
- Progression: Almaș→ Someș→ Tisza→ Danube→ Black Sea
- Tributaries
  - left: Țăudu
  - right: Cutiș

The Băbiu is a left tributary of the river Almaș in Romania. It flows into the Almaș in the village Almașu. It is 17 km (11 mi) long, and its basin size is 70 km^{2} (27 sq mi).
