= Plai =

Plai may refer to several places in Romania:

- Plai, a village in Avram Iancu Commune, Alba County
- Plai, a village in Gârda de Sus Commune, Alba County
- Plai, a village in Blăjeni Commune, Hunedoara County
- Plai, a village in Breznița-Motru Commune, Mehedinți County
- Plai, a village in Drajna Commune, Prahova County
- Plai, a village in Fundu Moldovei Commune, Suceava County
- Plai, a tributary of the Crișul Alb in Hunedoara County
- Plai (Mureș), a tributary of the Mureș in Hunedoara County
