= Radu Varia =

Romanian art critic and art historian (born 1940)

Radu Varia (born 1940) is a Romanian art critic and art historian.

== Biography ==
Born in Iași, Varia holds a degree from the University of Bucharest and a doctorate in History of Art and Civilization from the University of Paris. A friend of Salvador Dalí's, the two collaborated in preparing the 1974 opening of the Dalí Theatre and Museum in Figueras. Dalí also dedicated a 1972 poem to Varia, who awakened the painter's interest in Romanian language and culture. He has also helped set up every major exhibit of Horia Damian's work since the early 1970s. Among these have been shows at the Solomon R. Guggenheim Museum in New York City, the Musée National d'Art Moderne (Centre Pompidou) and Grand Palais in Paris, the Museum of Modern Art in Rio de Janeiro, Documenta IX in Kassel, the Venice Biennale, the São Paulo Art Biennial or the Mogoşoaia Palace. The last, taking place in 2009, brought together for the first time Damian's work from 1930 to 1946. Additionally, he has made a thorough study of the works of Constantin Brâncuși, writing essays and books on the subject, in particular the 1986 Brâncuși that appeared first in the United States, later in France and Japan. Varia has lectured widely since the 1970s, including at an afternoon tutorial held by Marshall McLuhan at the University of Toronto; at Waseda University in Tokyo; at the Museum der Weltkulturen in Frankfurt; at the Romanian Academy in Bucharest, at the Royal Scottish Academy in Edinburgh., at the Shenzhen University in China. He is married to soprano Mariana Nicolesco.

== Honours ==
In 2012, he is elected Honorary Member of the Royal Scottish Academy. In 2011, he was awarded, by the President of Romania, the Order of Cultural Merit and received the Silver Medal of the Royal Scottish Academy in Edinburgh. He is also a Knight of the Legion of Honour (2000) and, since 2005, a Commander of the Order of the Star of Italian Solidarity. In 2015, he was awarded the Mihai Eminescu International Academy Prize. In 2018, he was elected Doctor Honoris Causa of Chișinau Academy of Arts. In 2018, he was also elected Member of the European Academy of Sciences, Arts and Letters in Paris and Member of the Academia Scientiarum et Artium Europaea in Salzburg. By unanimous vote of the city councilors, on September 24, 2020, the critic and art historian Radu Varia became Honorary Citizen of Iași.

== Works ==
On Constantin Brâncuși:

- Brâncuși. Rizzoli, New York, 1986; Gallimard, Paris, 1989; New Art Seibu, Tokyo, 1993
- Brâncuși. A Stone, Being. Introduction to the exhibition Six Masterpieces from the Romanian Museums, Gagosian Gallery, New York, 1990
- Gânduri la Masa Tăcerii. Cuvânt despre Constantin Brâncuși (Thoughts at the Table of Silence). Lecture at the Romanian Academy published in Academica, Bucharest 1992
- Brâncuși in his universe: Maurice III, séducteur, photographe, sculpteur (Maurice III, seducer, photographer, sculptor) in Brâncuși, photographies, Hopkins-Custot, Paris, 2003
- Brâncuși, photographer of his own works. Lecture at The Museum der Weltkulturen, Frankfurt, 2009
- Brâncuși: A Great Spiritual Experience. Lecture at The Royal Scottish Academy, Edinburgh, 2011
- Brâncuși. Ansamblul Monumental de la Târgu Jiu în perspectivă istorică. (The Monumental Ensemble of Târgu Jiu in a historical perspective), FICB, Bucharest, 2001
- Brâncuși. Originale, copii, falsuri (Originals, copies, fakes), Document signed by 42 other art historians, directors of museums, artists), FICB, Bucharest, 2001
- Brâncuși fotograf (Brâncuși photographer), FICB, Bucharest, 2001
- Brâncuși în America (Brâncuși in America), FICB, Bucharest, 2001. First published in Revista Româno-Americană

On Salvador Dalí:

- Salvador Dalí, Împăratul Traian şi România (Salvador Dalí, Emperor Trajan and Romania). Lecture at the Romanian Academy, Bucharest, 2011

On Horia Damian:

- Damian. Introduction to the exhibition Les constructions de Damian (Damian's Constructions), Musée d’Art Moderne, Paris, 1972
- Damian. In the catalogue Galaxy, Stadt Aachen Neue Galerie, Aachen, 1974
- Damian and the Actual Infinite, introduction to the exhibition The Hill, The Solomon R. Guggenheim Museum, New York, 1976
- De l’instruction des formes premières (About the Primary Forms) in the volume Les symboles du lieu. L’habitation de l’homme (Symbols of place. Habitation of Man), L’Herne, Paris, 1983
- Metaphysics and Monumentality. Introduction to Damian's exhibition at the Documenta IX Exhibition, Kassel. Rizzoli, 1992
- One must be absolutely modern, said Rimbaud, even in his day. Introduction to the Damian catalogue, XLV Biennale di Venezia, Rizzoli, 1993
- Entrer dans l’invisible (Getting into the Invisible). Introduction to the exhibition Horia Damian, Galerie Karsten Greve, Paris, 2002
- Horia Damian, un mare solitar al secolului 20 (A Great Solitary of the 20th Century). The years 1930-1946. FICB, Bucharest (Mogoşoaia Palace), 2009
- Horia Damian - 96. Galeria Alexandra, Bucharest, 2018
