= József Nyírő =

Hungarian writer and politician

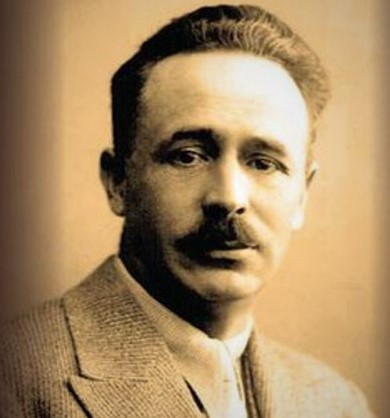
József Nyirő in the 1930s

József Nyírő (July 18, 1889 – October 16, 1953) was a Hungarian writer of popular short stories and novels; a politician associated with fascism who was accused of war crimes; and briefly a Catholic priest in Miluani.

== Biography ==
Nyírő was born July 18, 1889, in the village of Székelyzsombor, Udvarhely County, Kingdom of Hungary (today Jimbor, Brașov County). He was ordained in 1912, taught theology in Nagyszeben (today Sibiu), and became a priest in 1915. He left the priesthood in 1919 and married, operating a grist mill for a time. He then found success publishing short stories in magazines and newspapers and worked as a journalist for 10 years. In 1931 he inherited a farm estate and took it over.

Nyirő's political career is considered as controversial. He was a great admirer of Joseph Goebbels and was a member of the Fascist 'Arrow-Cross caucus' of the Arrow Cross Party. Nyírő joined the "Europäische Schriftstellervereinigung" (i.e., European Writers' League) founded by Joseph Goebbels. He became the speaker of Hungarian section of the European Writers' League before that position went to Lőrinc Szabó. After the Second Vienna Award of 1940, Nyírő joined the Hungarian parliament as a member of the extreme right-wing, antisemitic Transylvanian Party. In a 1942 speech, he referred to Jews as "well-poisoners" who "destroy the Hungarian soul, who infect our spirit," and declared that "This concept of the rundown liberal Jewish tradition, this veiled propaganda, must disappear from Hungarian life." In 1944, the Arrow Cross Party massacred over 10,000 Jews in Budapest. Throughout this period, Nyírő was editor of the right-wing publication Magyar Erő (Hungarian Might) and remained in the Arrow Cross parliament. After the war, he was charged with war crimes by Romania and Hungary; he fled to West Germany and died of cancer in Francisco Franco's Spain, where many fascists and Nazis found exile.

Nyirő's fiction, popular in the 1930s and 1940s, describes the life of the Székely villagers living in the Carpathian Mountains, such as woodcutters and farmers. The protagonist of his novel Uz Bence is the archetypal Székely man: physically strong, humorous, and shrewd, with instincts that allow him to survive in almost any situation. Nyírő's style was informed by expressionism and his stories show people in close harmony with nature, which he believed to be the true source of human happiness.

After World War II, he was discarded from the communist canon and largely forgotten because of his political background. An attempt was made by the right-wing in the early 21st century to re-establish him in the curriculum as part of a revision of the national literary canon.

== Reburial ==
In 2012, an attempt was made to move Nyírő's remains from Madrid, where his ashes were buried in 1953, to Odorheiu Secuiesc in Romania. The reburial was planned for May 27, but the Romanian government banned the move. Prime Minister of Romania Victor Ponta said that Romania rejects paying tribute on its soil to people known for anti-Semitic, anti-Romanian and pro-fascist conduct. In place of the reburial, a small ecumenical service for the writer took place. The ceremony was attended by the leadership of the Jobbik party, Hungary's State Secretary for Culture, Géza Szőcs, and the Speaker of the Hungarian Parliament, László Kövér. Kövér complained that the Romanian government is "uncivilized," "paranoid," "hysterical," "barbaric," and that the people "who had a son whose ashes were feared" would be "victorious." He announced that they will bury Nyírő one way or the other and that they had smuggled his ashes into the country. Government authorities searched vehicles to ensure the urn was not buried at the ceremony but its purported whereabouts remained unaccounted for.

Nobel Prize laureate and Holocaust survivor Elie Wiesel, in a letter to László Kövér, said he was furious that Kövér had participated in a ceremony honoring a writer who was a loyal member of Hungary's World War II far-right parliament, an act he suggested reflected the authorities' willingness to gloss over the country's dark past. "I found it outrageous that the Speaker of the Hungarian National Assembly could participate in a ceremony honoring a Hungarian fascist ideologue," Wiesel wrote. In further protest, Wiesel rejected the Great Cross, a Hungarian government award that he received in 2004.

Kövér in his answer letter to Wiesel stated that the American, British, and Soviet generals from the Allied Control Commission determined in 1945 and 1947, when they refused to extradite the exiled writer two times at the request of the contemporary Hungarian Communist Minister of the Interior, that Nyirő was not a war criminal, nor fascist or anti-Semitic. He also mentioned that Nicolae Ceaușescu's government treated Nyírő as a well-recognized writer and ensured pension for his widow in the 1970s. Kövér cited a Hungarian Jewish scientific review (the Libanon) and the newspaper stated that Nazi ideals or anti-Semitism can not be found in Nyírő's literary works. Nyírő, the Transylvanian-born Hungarian writer, deserves respect not because of his – although insignificant, but certainly tragically misguided – political activities but his literary works according to Kövér.
