= Printre Văi =

- Location within Romania

Location
- Country: Romania
- Counties: Sălaj County
- Villages: Fântânele, Stupini, Sânpetru Almașului

Physical characteristics
- Mouth: Almaș
  - location: Baica
  - coordinates: 47.0788°N 23.3020°E
- Length: 11 km (6.8 mi)
- Basin size: 47 km^{2} (18 sq mi)

Basin features
- Progression: Almaș→ Someș→ Tisza→ Danube→ Black Sea
- Tributaries
  - right: Strâmba

The Printre Văi is a right tributary of the river Almaș in Romania. It flows into the Almaș in Baica. Its length is 11 km (6.8 mi) and its basin size is 47 km^{2} (18 sq mi).
