= Petrind =

- Location within Romania

Location
- Country: Romania
- Counties: Sălaj County
- Villages: Petrindu, Tămașa

Physical characteristics
- Mouth: Almaș
  - location: Cuzăplac
  - coordinates: 46.9615°N 23.1880°E
- Length: 9 km (5.6 mi)
- Basin size: 36 km^{2} (14 sq mi)

Basin features
- Progression: Almaș→ Someș→ Tisza→ Danube→ Black Sea
- Tributaries
  - right: Dâncu

The Petrind is a right tributary of the river Almaș in Romania. It flows into the Almaș in Cuzăplac. Its length is 9 km (5.6 mi) and its basin size is 36 km^{2} (14 sq mi).
