= Mariana Nicolesco =

Romanian operatic soprano (1948–2022)

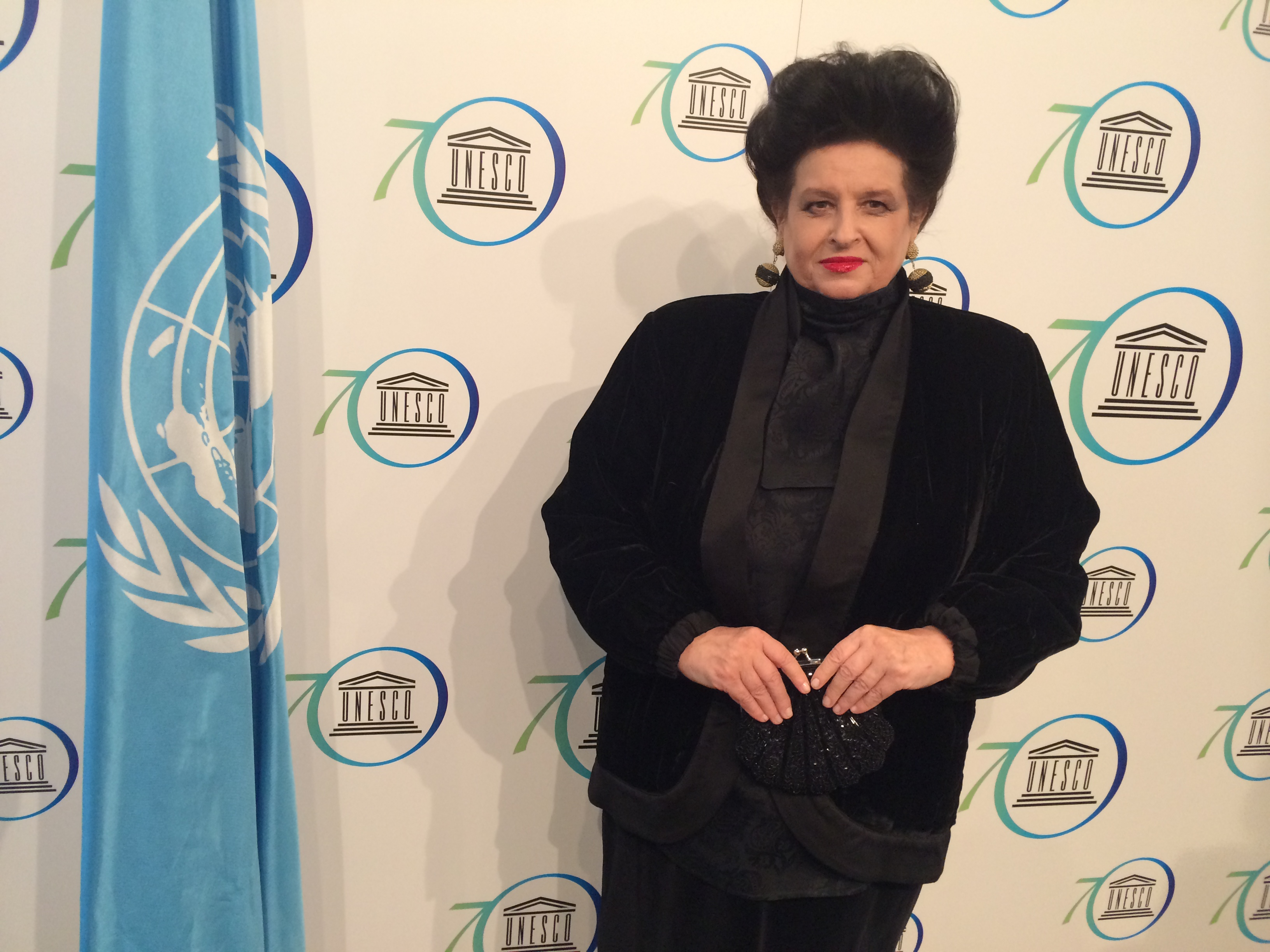
- Born: 28 November 1948; Găujani, Giurgiu County, Romanian People's Republic
- Died: 14 October 2022 (aged 73); Bucharest, Romania
- Resting place: Ghencea Cemetery, Bucharest
- Education: Gheorghe Dima Music Academy; Conservatorio di Santa Cecilia
- Occupation: Operatic soprano

Mariana Nicolesco (Romanian: [mariˈana nikoˈlesko] or pronounced [nikoˈlesku]; 28 November 1948 – 14 October 2022) was a Romanian operatic soprano who had an international career after she studied in Rome on a scholarship. She was a regular performer at La Scala in Milan where she performed Baroque opera such as Euridice in Rossi's Orfeo, Mozart roles such as Cinna in Lucio Silla in 1984, and contemporary including the world premiere of Luciano Berio's La Vera Storia in 1982.

== Career ==
Born in Găujani, Giurgiu County, Nicolesco studied violin at the Music High School in Brașov, graduating playing Bruch's Violin Concerto. She then turned to voice studies at the Music Conservatory in Cluj-Napoca, before winning a scholarship at the Conservatorio di Santa Cecilia in Rome to be taught canto by Jolanda Magnoni; she also worked with Rodolfo Celletti and Elisabeth Schwarzkopf. In 1972, she graduated and won the Voci Rossiniane competition in Milan, which launched an international career. American conductor Thomas Schippers invited her to Cincinnati as Mimì in Puccini's La Bohème, and later she was invited by Luchino Visconti to appear in Verdi's Don Carlos at the Teatro dell'Opera di Roma. She appeared at the Maggio Musicale Fiorentino first as Violetta in Verdi's La Traviata, directed by Visconti and conducted by Thomas Schippers, a role she reprised over 200 times.

Nicolesco made her debut at the Metropolitan Opera in New York City in 1978 as Nedda in Leoncavallo's Pagliacci, a role she performed there until 1986, followed by Verdi's Violetta and Gilda in Rigoletto. She sang in the world's major opera houses such as Teatro alla Scala in Milan, where she had her debut in the world première of Luciano Berio's La Vera Storia in 1982. Later roles there included Donna Anna in Dargomyzhsky's The Stone Guest in 1983, Cinna in Mozart's Lucio Silla in 1984, the soprano solo of Penderecki's Polish Requiem in 1985, Euridice in Rossi's Orfeo in 1985, La Protagonista in Berio's Un re in ascolto in 1986, Donna Elvira in Mozart's Don Giovanni in 1987, 1988 and 1993, Queen Climene in Jommelli's Fetonte in 1988, Ravel's cantatas Alcyone and Alyssa in 1990, and three recitals in 1988 and 1993.

She interpreted a wide repertoire from Baroque, belcanto, verismo and contemporary music, and has been described as "an arresting personality with a vibrant voice"; highlights were the roles of Marzelline in Beethoven's Fidelio, Mozart's Elettra in Idomeneo and Vitellia in La clemenza di Tito, the title roles of Bellini's Beatrice di Tenda, Donizetti's Anna Bolena, Maria di Rohan and Maria Stuarda, Queen Elizabeth I in Roberto Devereux, Verdi's Luisa in Luisa Miller, Amelia in Simon Boccanegra, Leonora in Il trovatore and Desdemona in Otello, Marguérite in Gounod's Faust, Tatyana in Tchaikovsky's Eugene Onegin, Liù in Puccini's Turandot, and Zarina Marina in Dvořák's Dimitrij. She appeared in productions directed by Giorgio Strehler, Patrice Chéreau, Luca Ronconi, Jean-Pierre Ponnelle, Franco Zeffirelli, Pier Luigi Pizzi, Jonathan Miller and conducted by Colin Davis. Carlo Maria Giulini, Peter Maag, Lorin Maazel, Riccardo Muti, Seiji Ozawa, Giuseppe Patané, Georges Prêtre, Gennady Rozhdestvensky, Wolfgang Sawallisch and Alberto Zedda. She appeared in halls including Carnegie Hall in New York, Royal Festival Hall in London, Accademia di Santa Cecilia in Rome, Concertgebouw in Amsterdam, Musikverein in Vienna, Salle Pleyel in Paris, the Great Conservatory Hall in Moscow. She performed at festivals such as Salzburg Festival, Rossini Opera Festival in Pesaro, Martina Franca Festival, and the Casals Festival in Puerto Rico. Invited by Pope John Paul II, she sang Romanian carols in the First Christmas Concert televised from the Vatican City in 1993, for a television audience of a billion people. The soprano part of Penderecki's Symphony No. 7 "Seven Gates of Jerusalem" was composed for her, and she sang in the world premiere in 1997 in Jerusalem, when the city celebrated 3000 years.

Nicolesco returned to Romania in 1991, after the fall of the Communist regime, singing for the first time on a stage in her native country, in a concert at the Romanian Atheneum in Bucharest. As some 10,000 tickets were purchased, Nicolesco gave three consecutive performances. She created the Romanian Atheneum International Foundation and donated in 1994 a Steinway grand concert piano. In 1995, Nicolesco initiated the Hariclea Darclée International Voice Competition and Festival. In the years between an edition of the Contest and the next, she offers Master Classes to the young artists. She obtained for the Darclée events the High UNESCO Patronage. In 2003, she created the Romanian National Festival and Song Competition. She presented for the International George Enescu Year, proclaimed by UNESCO in 2005, the composer's complete songs for the first time in Japan, at Aichi World Exhibition as well as in Nagoya and Tokyo, in Prague, Paris, Rome and New York City. In 2014 she was a member of the jury of the China International Vocal Competition with 430 competitors from 41 countries.

== Honours ==
Nicolesco was an honorary member of the Romanian Academy since 1993, Officer of the Order of the Arts and Letters in France from 2000, and honorary doctor of the Gheorghe Dima Music Academy in Cluj-Napoca from 1996. She was awarded the Order of the Star of Italian Solidarity in 2004 and the Order of the Star of Romania, in the Rank of Grand Cross in 2008. She was named UNESCO Artist for Peace in 2005 and UNESCO Goodwill Ambassador. She was elected the Most Successful Woman in Romania (2004) and was conferred the Special Award Kulturpreis Europa Medal in Sibiu, European Capital of Culture in 2007. She became an honorary member of the Mihai Eminescu International Academy in 2017, and honorary doctor of the Chisinau Academy of Arts in 2018. She was elected, also in 2018, a member of the European Academy of Sciences, Arts and Letters in Paris. In 2018 she was awarded the Honorary Diploma and Medal The Centenary of the Great Union as well as the Honorary Diploma and Medal 650 years of documentary attestation of the city of Braila. She was made an honorary citizen of Bucharest in 1991, and of Cluj-Napoca in 1994. She received in 2020 The Constantin Brâncoveanu Award for her entire career.

== Personal life and death ==
Nicolesco was married to art critic and art historian Radu Varia. She died at a hospital in Bucharest on 14 October 2022; after lying in repose at the Romanian Athenaeum, she will be buried on 19 October in the city's Ghencea Cemetery.

== Recordings ==
Nicolesco made several live recordings, including the first recordings of cantatas by Giacomo Meyerbeer and Maurice Ravel:

Year	Title	Role	Cast	Conductor Orchestra	Label
1976	Verdi: La Traviata	Violetta Valéry	Nicolesco, Kraus, Romero, et al.	Thomas Schippers; Maggio Musicale Fiorentino Orchestra	Living Stage 2004; Historical Performances
1981	Meyerbeer: Gli amori di Teolinda (cantata)	—	Nicolesco	Wolfgang Gönnenwein; Ludwigsburg Festival Orchestra	Pro Arte
1983	Puccini: La Rondine	Lisette	Te Kanawa, Domingo, Nicolesco, Nucci, et al.	Lorin Maazel; London Symphony Orchestra	CBS Records
1987	Bellini: Beatrice di Tenda	Beatrice di Tenda	Nicolesco, Toczyska, Cappuccilli, La Scola, et al.	Alberto Zedda; Monte-Carlo Philharmonic Orchestra	Rizzoli Records; Sony 1995, 2009
1987	Mozart: Le nozze di Figaro	Marcellina	Hynninen; Price, Battle, Nicolesco, et al.	Riccardo Muti; Vienna Philharmonic	EMI
1987	Ravel: Alyssa and Alcyone (cantatas)	—	Nicolesco, Denize, Meens, Glashof	Hubert Soudant; Bamberg Symphony	Rizzoli Records
1988	Donizetti: Maria di Rohan	Maria	Nicolesco, Morino, Coni, Franci, et al.	Massimo de Bernart; Orchestra Internazionale d'Italia	Nuova Era reissued 1991
1990	Verdi: Simon Boccanegra	Maria Boccanegra (Amelia Grimaldi)	Bruson, Nicolesco, Sabbatini, Scandiuzzi, et al.	Roberto Paternostro; Tokyo Symphony Orchestra	Capriccio reissued 2005
