= Slobozia Solar Park =

Photovoltaic power stations in Romania

- Country: Romania
- Location: Slobozia
- Coordinates: 43°52′N 25°54′E
- Status: Completed
- Commission date: 2013
- Construction cost: €100 million
- Owner: Samsung

Solar farm
- Type: Flat-panel PV

Power generation
- Units operational: 180,000
- Nameplate capacity: 45 MW
- Annual net output: 63 GWh

Slobozia Solar Park is a large thin-film photovoltaic (PV) power system, built on a 113 ha (280 acres) plot of land located in Slobozia, Giurgiu County in Romania. The solar park has around 180,000 state-of-the-art thin film PV panels for a total nameplate capacity of 45 megawatts, and was finished in September 2013. The solar park is expected to supply around 63 GWh of electricity per year enough to power some 69,000 average homes.

The investment cost for the solar park amounts to about €100 million.

== See also ==
- Energy policy of the European Union
- Photovoltaics
- Renewable energy commercialization
- Renewable energy in the European Union
- Solar power in Romania
