= Bălan, Sălaj =

Bălan
- Commune
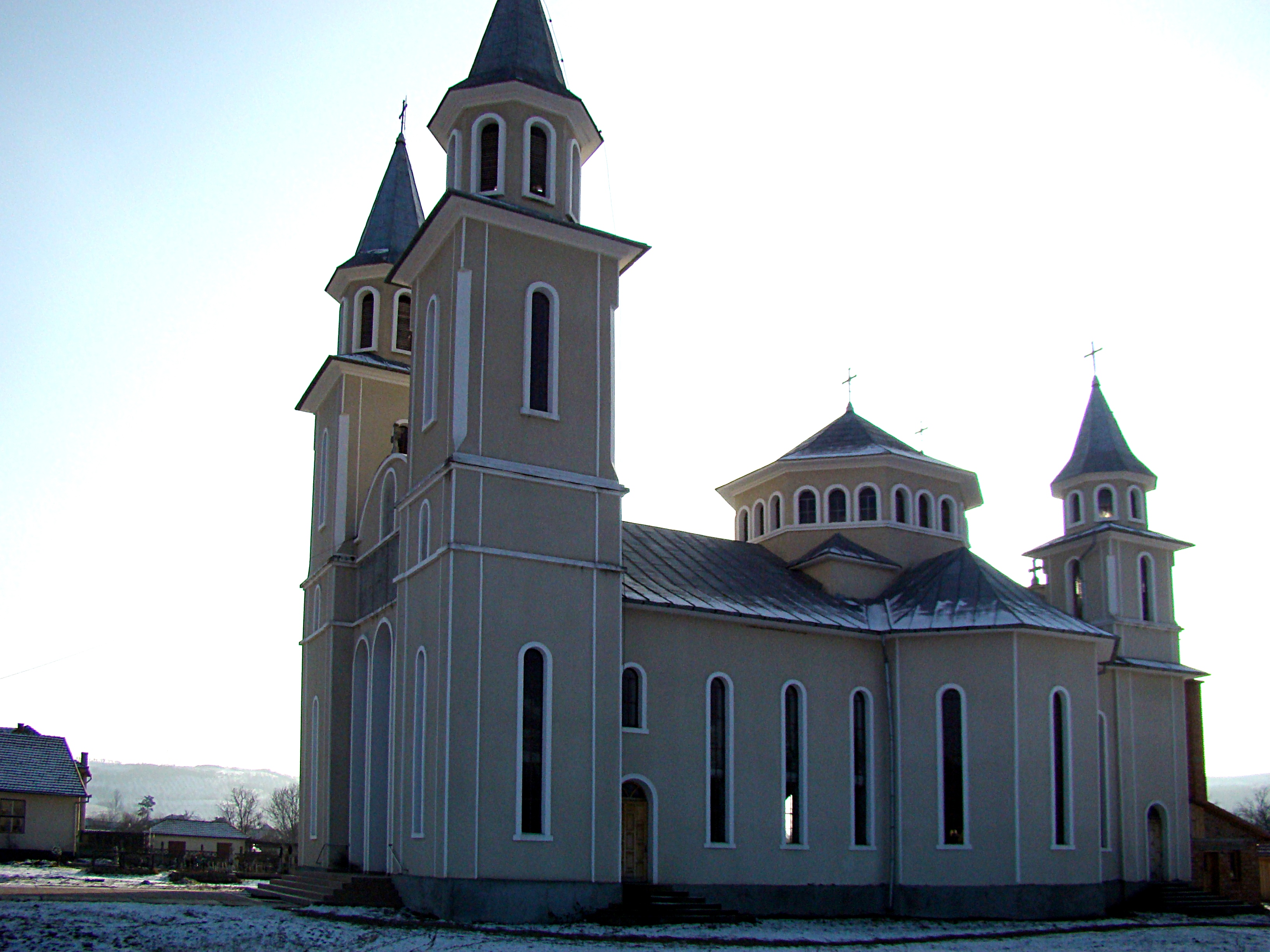
- Church in Bălan village

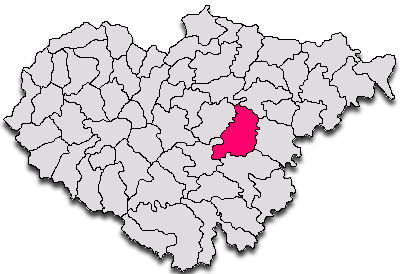
- Location in Sălaj County

- Location in Romania
- Coordinates: 47°09′16″N 23°18′27″E
- Country: Romania
- County: Sălaj

Government
  - Mayor (2020–2024): Daniel Pop (PNL)
- Area: 94.7 km^{2} (36.6 sq mi)
- Elevation: 219 m (719 ft)
- Population (2021-12-01): 3,660
  - Density: 38.6/km^{2} (100/sq mi)
- Time zone: UTC+02:00 (EET)
  - Summer (DST): UTC+03:00 (EEST)
- Postal code: 457025
- Area code: +(40) 0260
- Vehicle reg.: SJ
- Website: primariabalan.ro

Bălan (Hungarian: Almásbalázsháza) is a commune located in Sălaj County, Romania. It is composed of five villages: Bălan, Chechiș (Kettősmező), Chendrea (Kendermező), Gălpâia (Galponya), and Gâlgău Almașului (Almásgalgó). It is situated on the river Almaș, a tributary of the Someș.

== Sights ==
- Wooden Church in Bălan Josani, built in the 17th century (1695), historic monument
- Wooden Church in Bălan Cricova, built in the 19th century (1848), historic monument
- Wooden Church in Bălan, built in the 19th century, historic monument
- Grădina Zmeilor Natural Reserve (3 ha (7.4 acres))
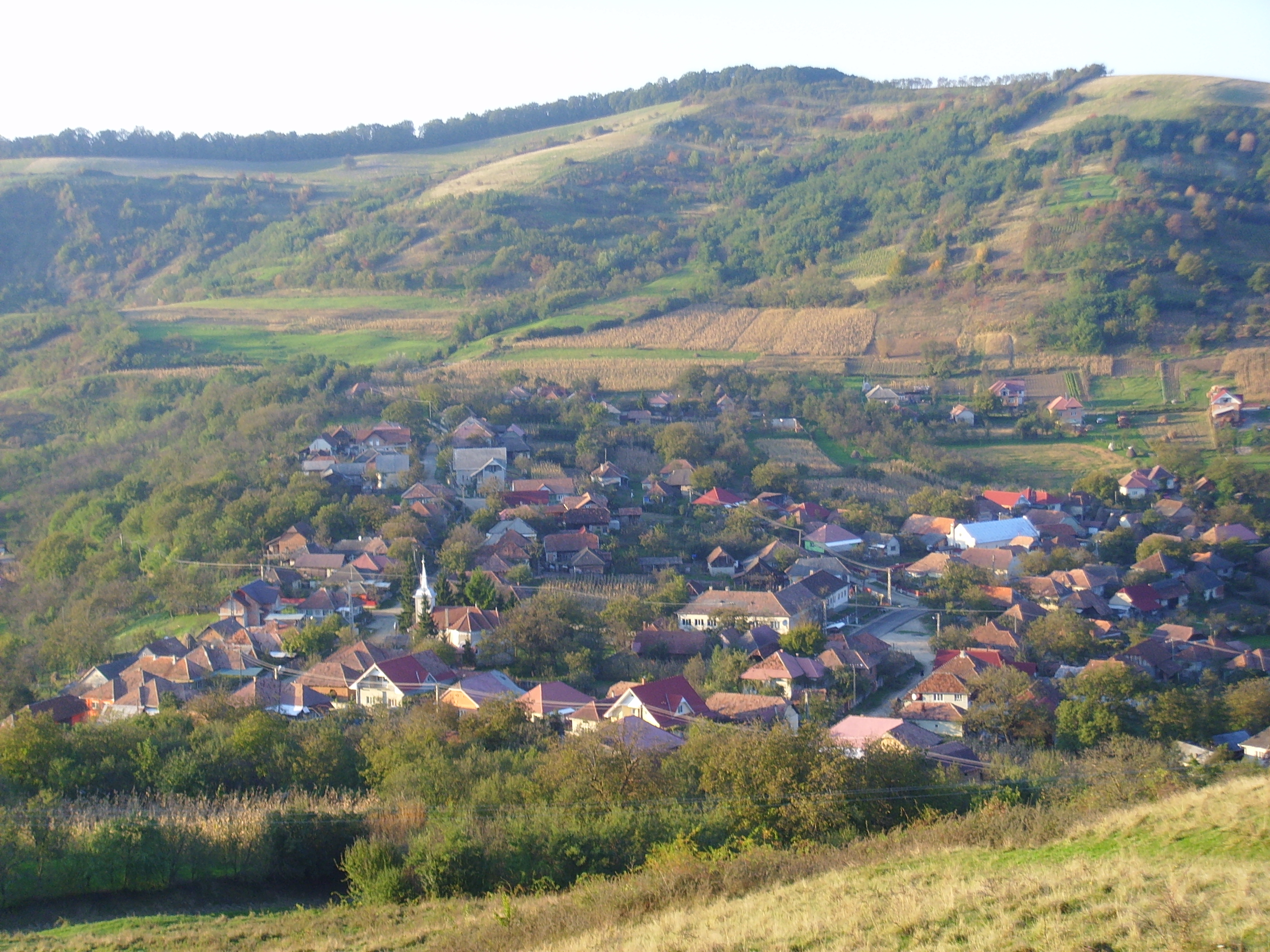
Gălpâia village

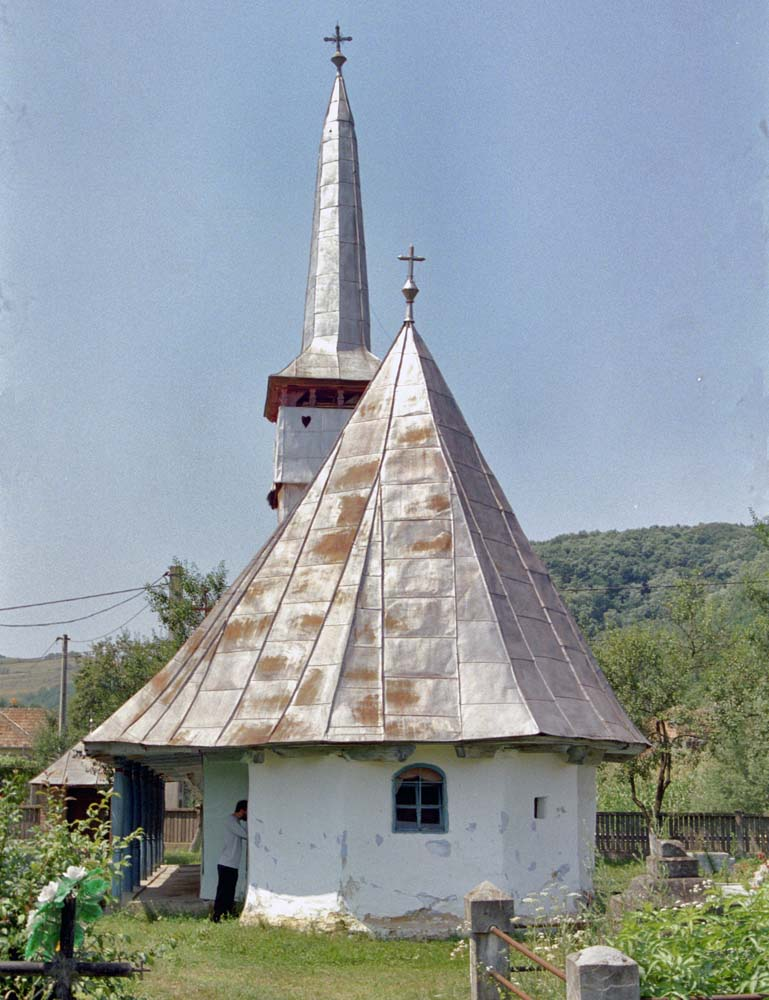
Wooden church, Chechiș (1797, 1899)

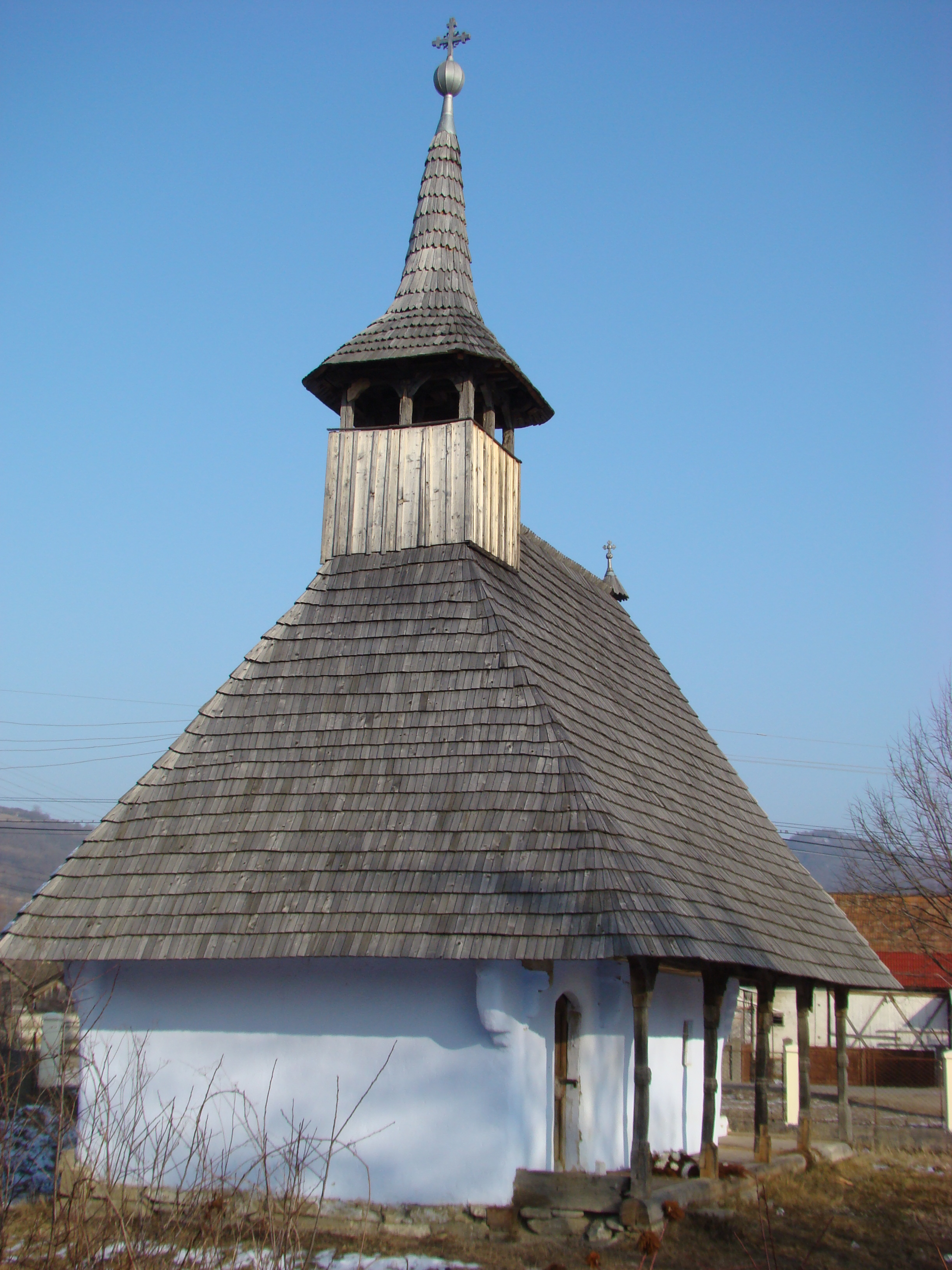
Wooden church in Bălan Cricova
