= Ponoară =

- Location within Romania

Location
- Country: Romania
- Counties: Botoșani County
- Villages: Guranda, Băbiceni

Physical characteristics
- Mouth: Corogea
  - coordinates: 47.7116°N 27.1642°E
- Length: 16 km (9.9 mi)
- Basin size: 58 km^{2} (22 sq mi)
- Discharge
  - location: *
  - minimum: 0.002 m^{3}/s (0.071 cu ft/s)
  - maximum: 54.6 m^{3}/s (1,930 cu ft/s)

Basin features
- Progression: Corogea→ Prut→ Danube→ Black Sea
- River code: XIII.1.11.1

The Ponoară is a right tributary of the river Corogea in Romania. It flows into the Corogea near Tudor Vladimirescu. Its length is 16 km (9.9 mi) and its basin size is 58 km^{2} (22 sq mi).
