= Polocin =

- Location within Romania

Location
- Country: Romania
- Counties: Bacău, Vrancea
- Villages: Gherdana, Tătărăști, Lespezi

Physical characteristics
- Source: Central Moldavian Plateau
- Mouth: Siret
  - location: Homocea
  - coordinates: 46.1305°N 27.2173°E
- Length: 24 km (15 mi)
- Basin size: 106 km^{2} (41 sq mi)

Basin features
- Progression: Siret→ Danube→ Black Sea
- Tributaries
  - left: Perchiu

The Polocin is a left tributary of the river Siret in Romania. It discharges into the Siret in Homocea. The basin size of the 24 km (15 mi) long Polocin is 106 km^{2} (41 sq mi).
