= Parapanca =

- Location within Romania

Location
- Country: Romania
- Counties: Giurgiu County
- Villages: Gogoșari

Physical characteristics
- Mouth: Danube
  - location: Slobozia
  - coordinates: 43.8492°N 25.9294°E
- Length: 29 km (18 mi)
- Basin size: 490 km^{2} (190 sq mi)

Basin features
- Progression: Danube→ Black Sea
- Tributaries
  - left: Ciuvica
  - right: Pasărea

The Parapanca is a small left tributary of the river Danube in Romania. It discharges into the Danube in Slobozia. Its length is 29 km (18 mi) and its basin size is 490 km^{2} (190 sq mi).
