= Perchiu =

- Location within Romania

Location
- Country: Romania
- Counties: Bacău County
- Villages: Ocheni, Huruiești, Perchiu, Prădaiș

Physical characteristics
- Mouth: Polocin
  - coordinates: 46.1795°N 27.2388°E
- Length: 14 km (8.7 mi)
- Basin size: 28 km^{2} (11 sq mi)

Basin features
- Progression: Polocin→ Siret→ Danube→ Black Sea

The Perchiu is a left tributary of the river Polocin in Romania. It flows into the Polocin near Prădaiș. Its length is 14 km (8.7 mi) and its basin size is 28 km^{2} (11 sq mi).
