= Vedea, Giurgiu =

Vedea
- Commune
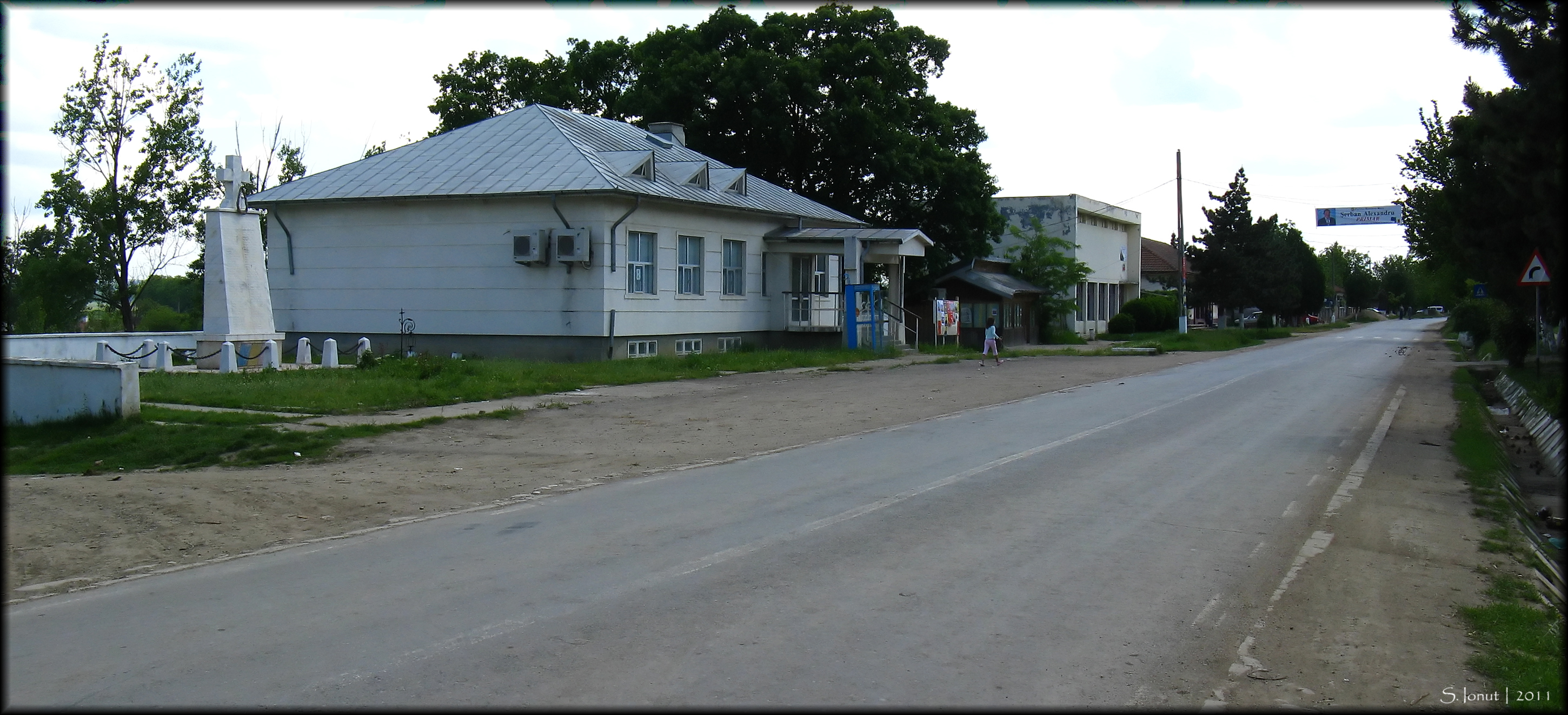
- Road DN5C going through Vedea

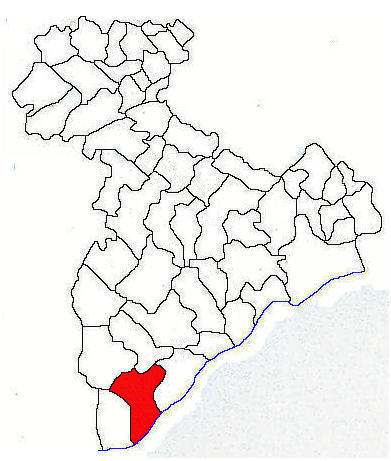
- Location in Giurgiu County

- Location in Romania
- Coordinates: 43°48′N 25°46′E
- Country: Romania
- County: Giurgiu

Government
  - Mayor (2020–2024): Marian Țaga (PNL)
- Area: 80.87 km^{2} (31.22 sq mi)
- Elevation: 26 m (85 ft)
- Population (2021-12-01): 2,540
  - Density: 31.4/km^{2} (81.3/sq mi)
- Time zone: UTC+02:00 (EET)
  - Summer (DST): UTC+03:00 (EEST)
- Postal code: 087260
- Area code: +(40) 246
- Vehicle reg.: GR
- Website: www.primariavedea.ro

Vedea is a commune located in Giurgiu County, Muntenia, Romania. It is composed of a single village, Vedea. It also included the village of Malu until 2003, when it was split off to form Malu Commune.

Historical population
| Year | Pop. | ±% |
|---|---|---|
| 2002 | 3,224 | — |
| 2011 | 3,108 | −3.6% |
| 2021 | 2,540 | −18.3% |
Source: Census data
