= Peștiș (Mureș) =

Peștiș Pestes-patak
- Location within Romania

Location
- Country: Romania
- Counties: Arad County

Physical characteristics
- Mouth: Mureș
  - location: Cuiaș
  - coordinates: 45.9908°N 22.3031°E
- Length: 9 km (5.6 mi)
- Basin size: 34 km^{2} (13 sq mi)

Basin features
- Progression: Mureș→ Tisza→ Danube→ Black Sea
- Tributaries
  - left: Bulza

The Peștiș (Hungarian: Pestes-patak) is a left tributary of the river Mureș in Romania. It discharges into the Mureș in Cuiaș. Its length is 9 km (5.6 mi) and its basin size is 34 km^{2} (13 sq mi).
