= Ghioroiu =

- Commune
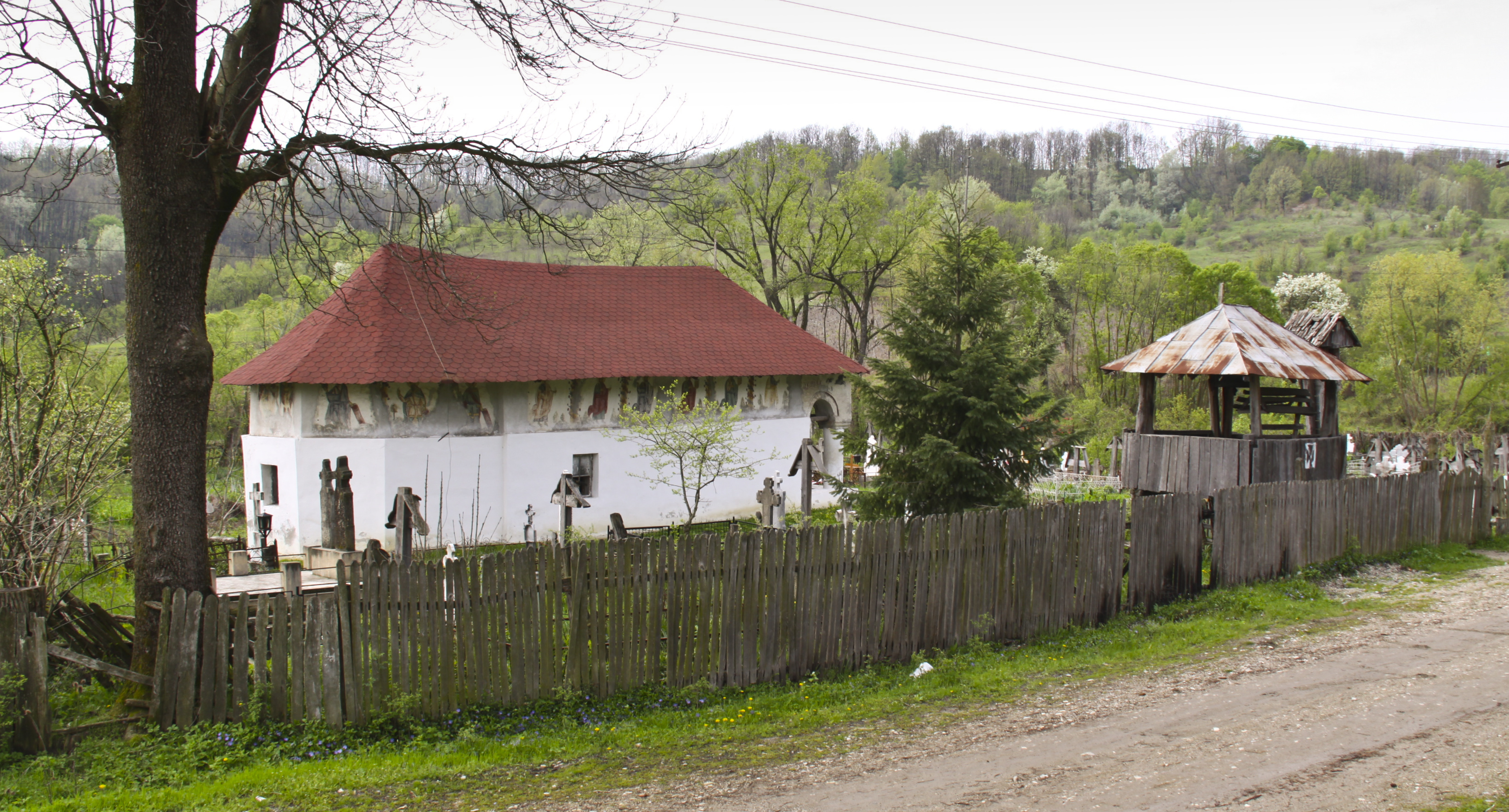
- The Saint Voivodes Church, Mierea

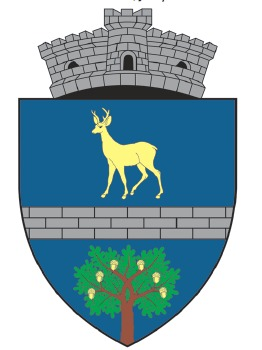
- Coat of arms

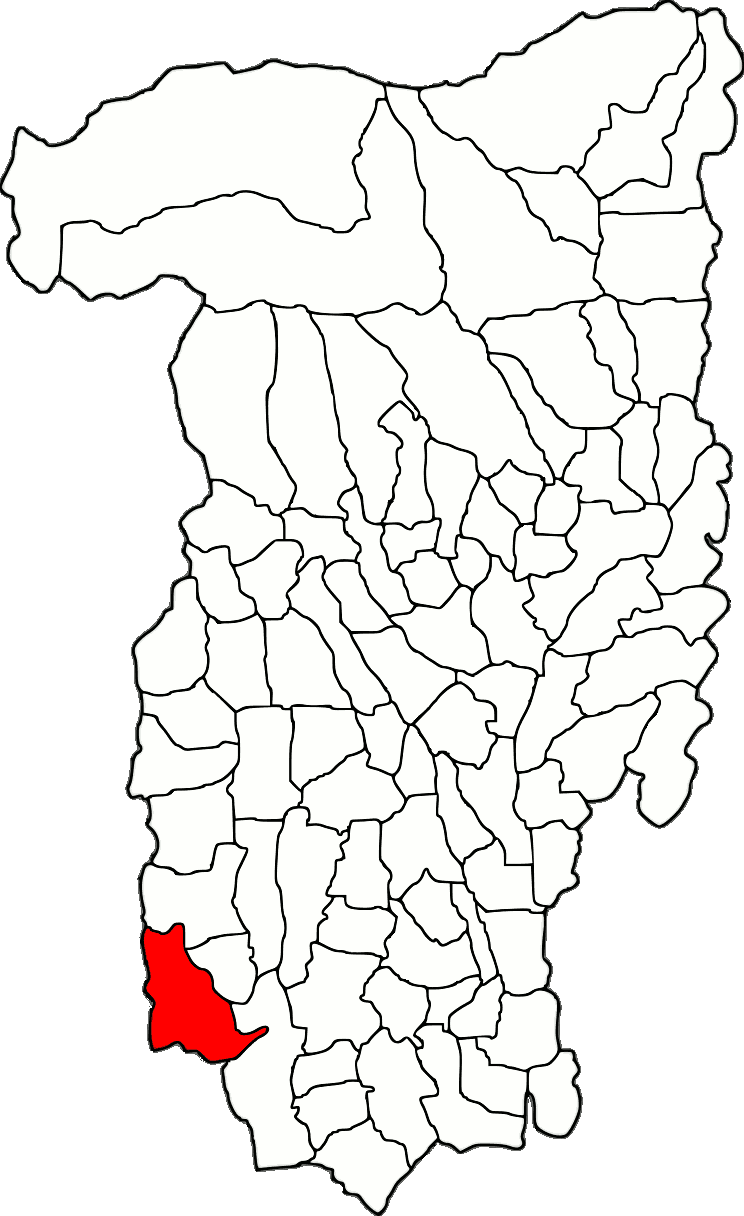
- Location in Vâlcea County

- Location in Romania
- Coordinates: 44°42′N 23°50′E
- Country: Romania
- County: Vâlcea

Government
  - Mayor (2020–2024): Iosiv Predescu (PNL)
- Area: 77.25 km^{2} (29.83 sq mi)
- Elevation: 238 m (781 ft)
- Population (2021-12-01): 1,344
  - Density: 17.40/km^{2} (45.06/sq mi)
- Time zone: UTC+02:00 (EET)
  - Summer (DST): UTC+03:00 (EEST)
- Postal code: 247215
- Area code: +(40) 250
- Vehicle reg.: VL
- Website: primariaghioroiu.ro

Ghioroiu is a commune located in Vâlcea County, Oltenia, Romania. It is composed of six villages: Căzănești, Ghioroiu, Herăști, Mierea, Poienari, and Știrbești.

The commune is situated in the Wallachian Plain, at an altitude of 238 m (781 ft), on the banks of the river Peșteana. It is located in the southwestern part of Vâlcea County, 90 km (56 mi) from the county seat, Râmnicu Vâlcea, on the border with Gorj and Dolj counties.
