= Homocea =

- Commune
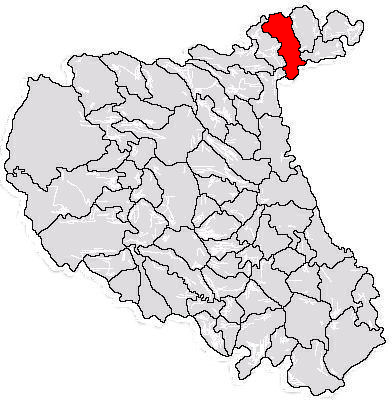
- Location in Vrancea County

- Location in Romania
- Coordinates: 46°8′N 27°14′E
- Country: Romania
- County: Vrancea

Government
  - Mayor (2024–2028): Vasile Petrea (PNL)
- Area: 21.51 km^{2} (8.31 sq mi)
- Elevation: 92 m (302 ft)
- Population (2021-12-01): 7,312
  - Density: 340/km^{2} (880/sq mi)
- Time zone: EET/EEST (UTC+2/+3)
- Postal code: 627175
- Area code: +(40) 237
- Vehicle reg.: VN
- Website: homocea.primarievn.ro

Homocea is a commune located in Vrancea County, Romania. It is composed of three villages: Costișa, Homocea, and Lespezi.

Historical population
Year	Pop.	±%
2002	6,784	—
2011	6,625	−2.3%
2021	7,312	+10.4%
Source: Census data
