= Pasărea (Danube) =

- Location within Romania

Location
- Country: Romania
- Counties: Teleorman
- Villages: Năsturelu, Zimnicele, Zimnicea

Physical characteristics
- Mouth: Danube
  - coordinates: 43.6445°N 25.3322°E
- Length: 19 km (12 mi)
- Basin size: 191 km^{2} (74 sq mi)

Basin features
- Progression: Danube→ Black Sea

The Pasărea is a left tributary of the river Danube in Romania. It discharges into the Danube in Zimnicea. Its length is 19 km (12 mi) and its basin size is 191 km^{2} (74 sq mi).
