= Peșteana (Olteț) =

Peșteana Pesceana
- Location within Romania

Location
- Country: Romania
- Counties: Vâlcea County

Physical characteristics
- Mouth: Olteț
  - location: Bălcești
  - coordinates: 44.6250°N 23.9493°E
- Length: 36 km (22 mi)
- Basin size: 99 km^{2} (38 sq mi)

Basin features
- Progression: Olteț→ Olt→ Danube→ Black Sea
- Tributaries
  - left: Peștenița

The Peșteana (also: Pesceana) is a right tributary of the river Olteț in Romania. It discharges into the Olteț in Bălcești. It flows through the villages Poienari, Ghioroiu, Herăști, Știrbești, Căzănești and Bălcești. Its length is 36 km (22 mi) and its basin size is 99 km^{2} (38 sq mi).
