= Fildu de Jos =

- Commune
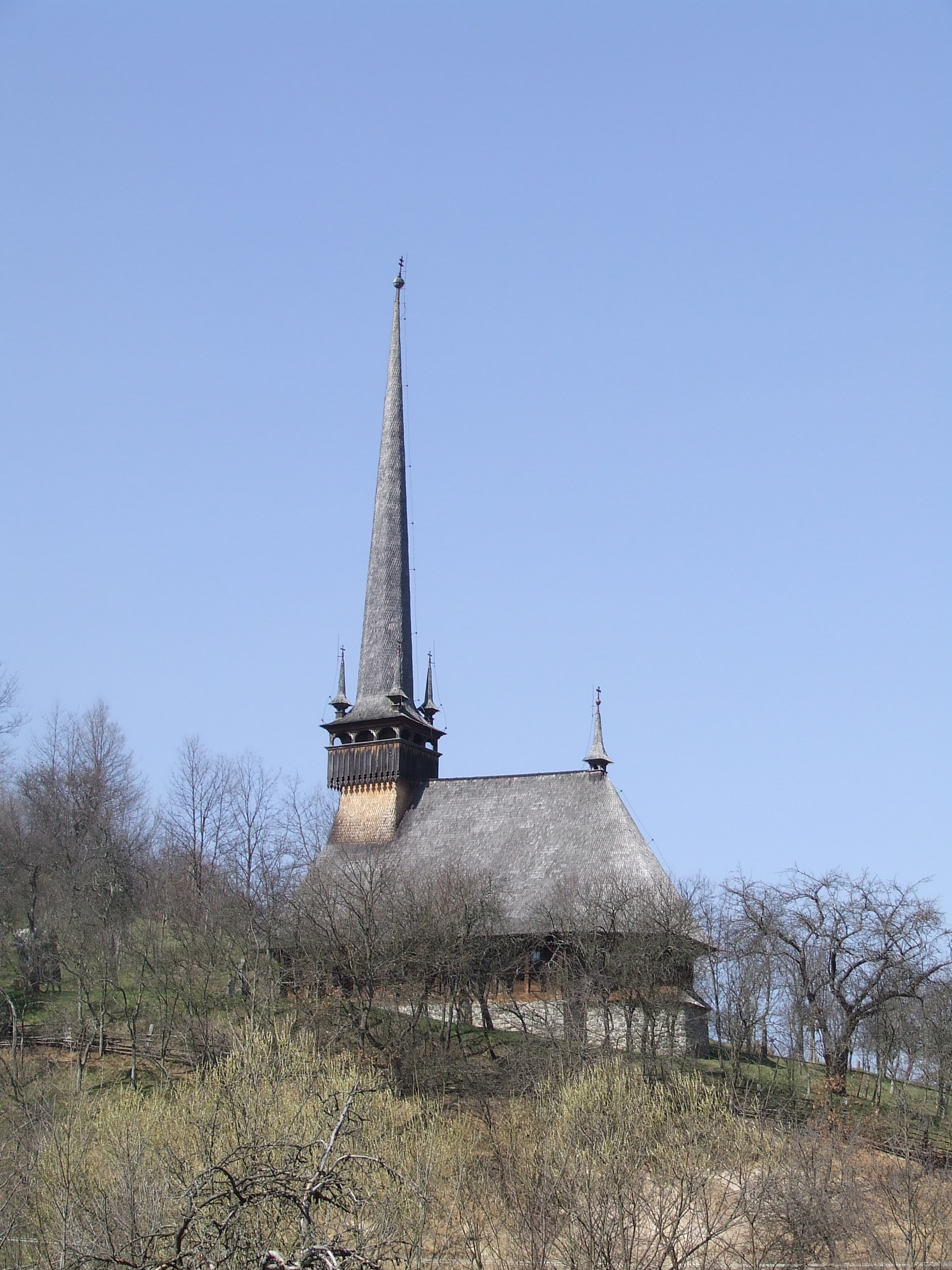
- Wooden church in Fildu de Sus

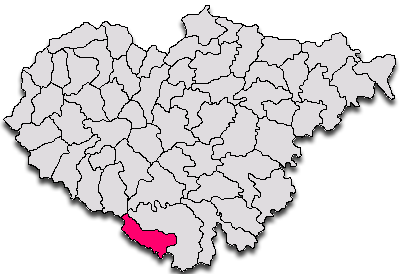
- Location in Sălaj County

- Location in Romania
- Coordinates: 46°55′11″N 23°03′28″E
- Country: Romania
- County: Sălaj

Government
  - Mayor (2020–2024): Nicolae Albert (Ind.)
- Area: 62.88 km^{2} (24.28 sq mi)
- Elevation: 368 m (1,207 ft)
- Population (2021-12-01): 1,280
  - Density: 20.4/km^{2} (52.7/sq mi)
- Time zone: UTC+02:00 (EET)
  - Summer (DST): UTC+03:00 (EEST)
- Postal code: 457135
- Area code: +(40) x60
- Vehicle reg.: SJ
- Website: primariafildudejos.ro

Fildu de Jos (Hungarian: Alsófüld) is a commune located in the southern part of Sălaj County, Transylvania, Romania. Fildu de Jos is the contact point between Almaș Basin, the Meses Mountains and the northern part of the Huedin Basin, and is situated at 57 km from Zalău. It is composed of four villages: Fildu de Jos, Fildu de Mijloc (Középfüld), Fildu de Sus (Felsőfüld), and Tetișu (Ketesd).

Archeological excavations have brought to the surface traces of settlements which existed prior to the Roman occupation. The actual villages were situated along the main cross-roads between the Roman camps in the valley of the river Crișul Repede and Porolissum. Fildu de Jos was attested in 1249 under the name Terra Fyld, Fildu de Sus and Fildu de Mijloc in 1415 and Tetișu in 1399.

== Population and climate ==
At the 2002 census the population counted 1,583 inhabitants of which 63.10% were Romanians, 21.22% Hungarians, 15.47% Roma, and 0.21% were of other nationalities. At the 2011 census, there were 1,441 inhabitants; of those, 54.27% were Romanians, 22.83% Roma, and 20.75% Hungarians. At the 2021 census, Fildu de Jos had a population of 1,280, of which 50.86% were Romanians, 25.78% Roma, and 15.16% Hungarians.

Because of the favourable weather, agriculture is well represented by potato-growing and livestock-breeding.

The picturesque mountainous landscapes and the architectural monuments such as the wooden church "Pogorârea Sfântului Duh" dated from 1727 and entered in the national cultural patrimony, the wooden church "Sfinții Arhangheli" in Fildu de Jos (1630) and the reformed church in Tetișu (14th century) are the main important tourist spectacles.

== Wooden church of Fildu de Sus ==
The church was built in 1727 by the artist Freont Nicoara from Agrij and Chendre of Petre Brudului. The painting was executed in 1856 and is well preserved, but the painter remains unknown. Its central tower stands over 40 m tall. The last renovation was carried out in 1988-1999. It is considered by several authors to be representative of the traditional architecture of this region and is listed on the official list of historic monuments of Romania.
