= Pocloș =

Pocloş Poklos-patak
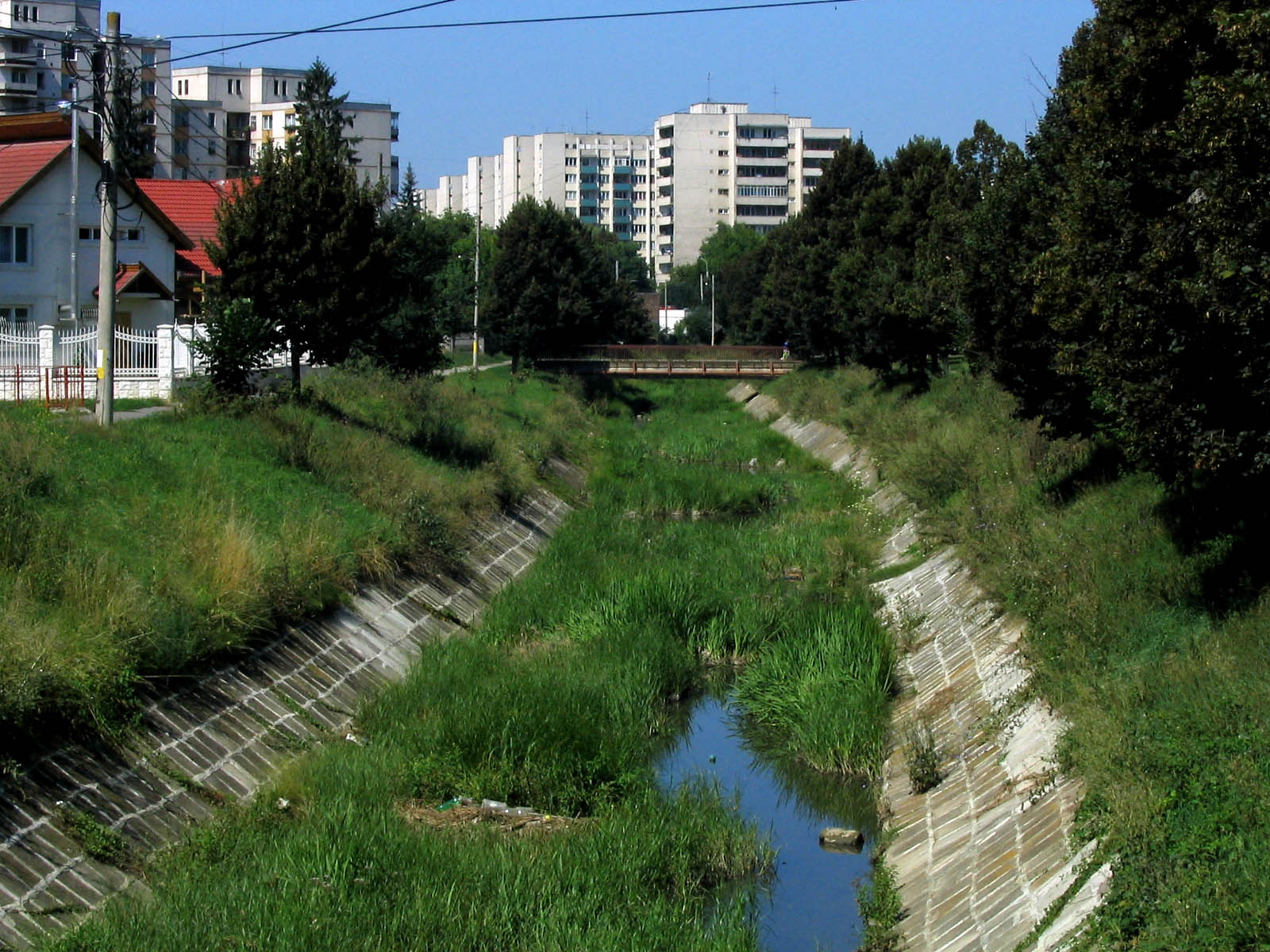

- Location within Romania

Location
- Country: Romania
- Counties: Mureș County
- Cities: Târgu Mureș

Physical characteristics
- Mouth: Mureș
  - location: Târgu Mureș
  - coordinates: 46.5421°N 24.5286°E
- Length: 13 km (8.1 mi)
- Basin size: 61 km^{2} (24 sq mi)

Basin features
- Progression: Mureș→ Tisza→ Danube→ Black Sea

The Pocloș ( Hungarian: Poklos, Poklos-patak ) is a left tributary of the river Mureș in Transylvania, Romania. It discharges into the Mureș in Târgu Mureș. Its length is 13 km (8.1 mi) and its basin size is 61 km^{2} (24 sq mi). Its name in Hungarian means "Hellish Creek".
