= Malu, Giurgiu =

Malu
- Commune
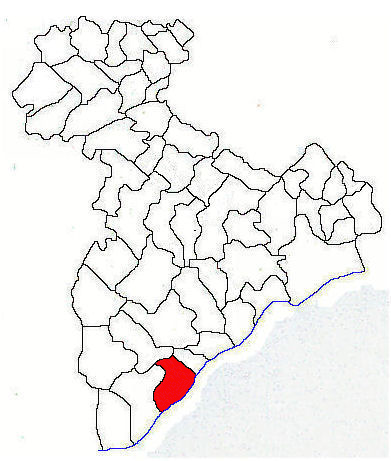
- Location in Giurgiu County

- Location in Romania
- Coordinates: 43°49′N 25°49′E
- Country: Romania
- County: Giurgiu

Government
  - Mayor (2024–2028): Florea Urucu (PSD)
- Area: 39.8 km^{2} (15.4 sq mi)
- Elevation: 25 m (82 ft)
- Population (2021-12-01): 2,056
  - Density: 52/km^{2} (130/sq mi)
- Time zone: EET/EEST (UTC+2/+3)
- Postal code: 087261
- Area code: +(40) 246
- Vehicle reg.: GR
- Website: primaria-malu.ro

Malu is a commune located in Giurgiu County, Muntenia, Romania. It is composed of a single village, Malu, part of Vedea Commune until it was split off in 2003.

Historical population
Year	Pop.	±%
2002	2,649	—
2011	2,376	−10.3%
2021	2,056	−13.5%
Source: Census data
