= Năsturelu =

- Commune
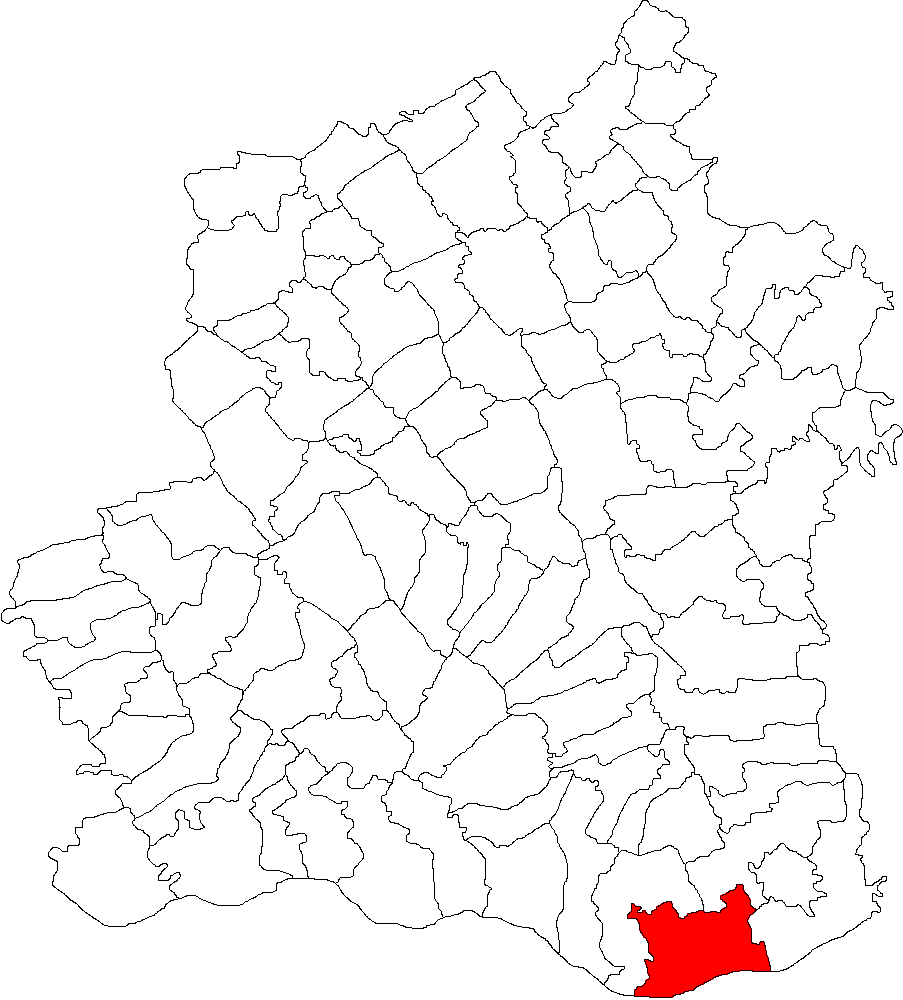
- Location in Teleorman County

- Location in Romania
- Coordinates: 43°40′N 25°28′E
- Country: Romania
- County: Teleorman
- Subdivisions: Năsturelu, Zimnicele
- Population (2021-12-01): 2,248
- Time zone: EET/EEST (UTC+2/+3)
- Vehicle reg.: TR

Năsturelu is a commune in Teleorman County, Muntenia, Romania. It is composed of two villages, Năsturelu and Zimnicele.
