= Eugen Ciucă =

American sculptor

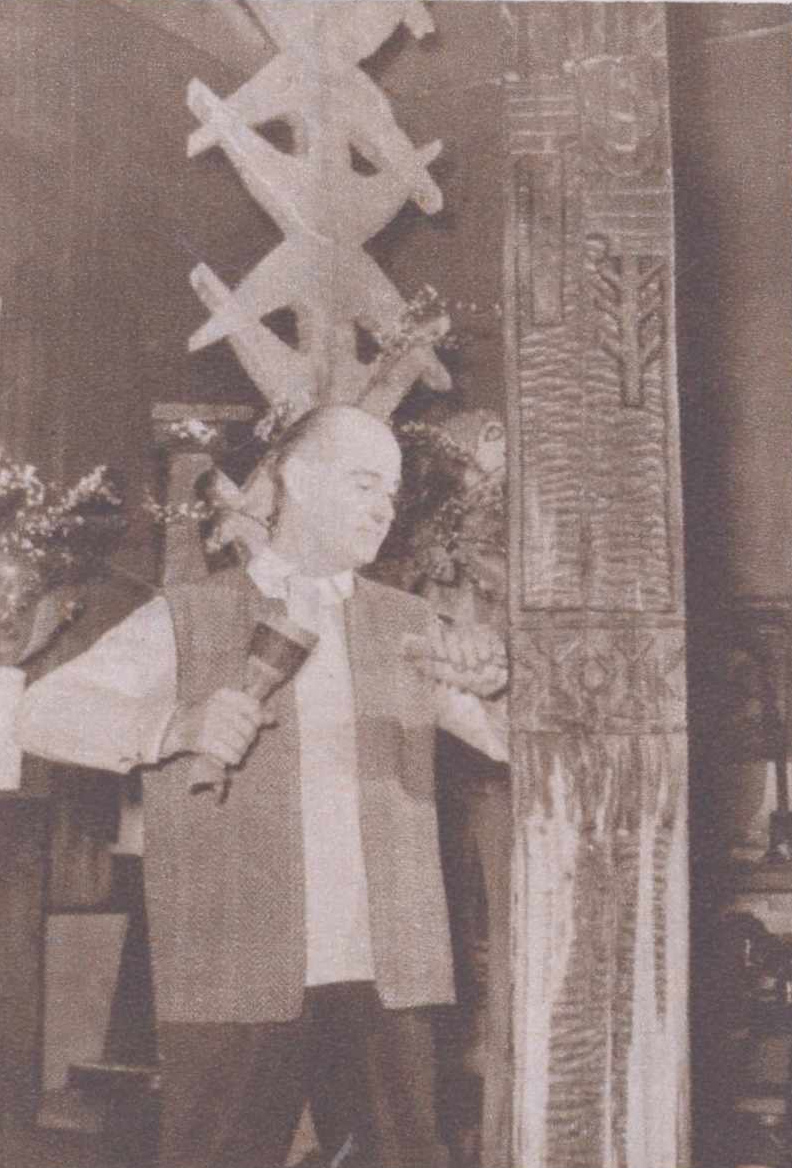
- Eugen Ciucă in 1977
- Born: 27 February 1913; Miluani, Sălaj County, Romania
- Died: 26 September 2005 (aged 92); New York City, United States
- Education: University of Cluj; Bucharest Academy of Fine Arts; University of Bucharest
- Known for: Sculpture, Painting, Drawing
- Movement: Modernism

Eugen Ciucă (Romanian: [e.uˈdʒen ˈtʃjukə]; 27 February 1913 – 26 September 2005) was a Romanian-American artist known for his monumental sculptures, vivid paintings and drawings of delicate feminine figures. He spent the most successful years of his career in Italy, where he created many works inspired by the Divine Comedy and its author Dante Alighieri. Ciucă's art has been displayed in nearly 100 exhibitions across Europe and the United States.

== Education and career ==
Born in Miluani village, Sălaj County, he studied Economics at the University of Cluj (1934–1938) and later went to the Bucharest Academy of Fine Arts (1942–1946) and the Pedagogical Institute of the University of Bucharest (1945–1947). During World War II he served as a military officer and went on to create a monument to the heroes of the Romanian army at Piešťany, Slovakia (To The Heroes – 1946).

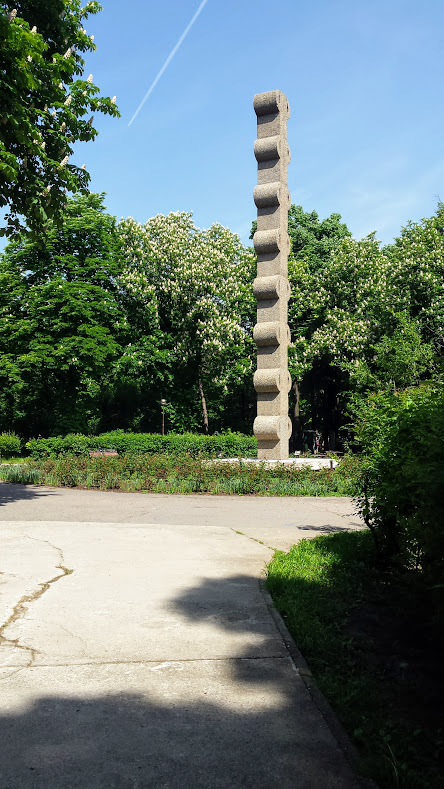
The Festive Column, Herăstrău Park, Bucharest

After the war, Ciucă set up a studio in Bucharest, where he worked until leaving Romania in 1968. He also taught Anatomy Drawing at the University of Bucharest and was Director of the Monumental Sculpture Art Studio of Fondul Plastic, UAP, Bucharest (1958–1960).

He held the first Romanian open-air exhibition on Calea Victoriei (1957) and designed The Festive Column (1964), a 20 m (66 ft) high concrete and stone monument that stands in Herăstrău Park, Bucharest. His major Romanian exhibition at Sala Dalles (1965), which coincided with the 700-year anniversary of Dante's birth, brought Ciucă notoriety and international recognition.

In 1967 he was invited to Padua to build Monument to Dante in Pontelongo. Shortly after that he had two one-man exhibitions in Padua and Rome and was a major exhibitor at the Palazzo Al Valentino in Turin.

The following year he represented Romania at the International Symposium of Sculpture Forma Viva in Yugoslavia (now Slovenia) with the wooden sculpture inspired from Romanian folk art, The Archaic Column (1968).

Prompted by growing international success and the hardship and lack of opportunities in communist Romania, Ciucă left his homeland in 1968. He first moved to Venice, where he set up a studio and continued to participate in many individual and joint exhibits. His work was widely sought after by many private collectors.

Ciucă became a United States citizen in 1975, two years after establishing a residence and studio in Long Island, NY. A year later, during the festivities dedicated to the Bicentennial of the American Revolution, his sculpture, Universal Harmony, was put on display at the White House in Washington, D.C. and still remains in the collection of the Gerald R. Ford Museum.

In 1976 a series of 220 of Ciucă's paintings and sculptures dedicated entirely to Dante Alighieri were on exhibit for four months at the tomb of the poet at Chiostro Di Dante in Ravenna.

He kept working and traveling between Italy and the US for many years. In 1984, he moved his New York residence to Jackson Heights, in Queens and his Italian residence to Capriccio, in Padua. He retired permanently to Jackson Heights in 1989, where he continued to work in spite of his old age.

== Artistic style ==
Ciucă was a prolific artist whose work, described as both folkloric and modern, encompasses many media. A master at sculpting in polychrome marble, granite, wood, onyx, ceramics, bronze, copper and mosaic, he also completed numerous paintings – many on glass – as well as watercolors, etchings and drawings.

Throughout his career, which spanned more than a half-century, Ciucă explored several themes and concepts. Through his work, he blended elements of Romanian folk art with the more contemporary concept of art's fourth dimension, in which the artist provides a visual expression for feelings such as optimism, curiosity, remorse or fear.

A vast amount of Ciucă's art was dedicated to Dante Alighieri, poet and author of The Divine Comedy. Inspired by the beauty of Dante's muse, Beatrice, he created countless sculptures, paintings and drawings depicting the delicate feminine figure that would become his trademark. In addition to several monumental sculptures representing the poet, Ciucă created a series of paintings named The Divine Comedy in 600 Images.

== Sculptures and works ==
=== Museum collections ===
- National Museum of Contemporary Art - Bucharest, Romania – (5 polychrome marble heads)
- National Military Museum, Romania – Bucharest, Romania – Trajan (monumental bust)
- Hungarian National Gallery – Budapest, Hungary – Figure With Flower
- Museum of Modern Art, Ljubljana – Ljubljana, Slovenia – The Flight
- Venetian Arsenal – Venice, Italy – Dante Alighieri (monumental head)
- Beethoven House – Bonn, Germany – Symphony to Beethoven

=== Monuments ===
- Boundary – 1943 – Carol Davila University of Medicine and Pharmacy, Bucharest, Romania – Height: 224 cm (88 in)
- To The Heroes – 1946 – Piešťany, Czechoslovakia – Height: 700 cm (280 in)
- Sport Statues For The Stadium – 1950 – Bucharest, Romania
- The Festive Column – 1964 – Herăstrău Park, Bucharest, Romania – Height: 18 m (59 ft)
- Musician Enesco – 1966 – Slobozia, Romania
- Dante Alighieri – 1967 – Pontelongo, Padua, Italy – Height: 8 m (26 ft)
- The Archaic Column – 1968 – Kostanjevica na Krki, Slovenia – Height: 9 m (30 ft) (wood)
- The Monument to The Partisans – 1968 – Kostanjevica na Krki, Slovenia – Height: 8 m (26 ft) (wood and stone)
- The Monument of The Heroes – 1972 – Mira, Oriago, Italy
- Dante (monumental bust) – 1974 – Town Hall of Cappricio, Padua, Italy
- Universal Harmony – 1976 – White House, Washington, D.C., USA (currently in the collection of the Gerald R. Ford Museum)
- Dante – 1976 – Centro Dantesco Museum, Ravenna, Italy – (hammered copper)

== Awards and accomplishments ==
- First Prize - Monumental Sports Sculptures Contest – 1952 – Bucharest, Romania
- Honorary Citizen of Pontelongo – 1968 – Padua, Italy
- Gold Medal – International Joint Contest at the International Culture Centre of Jesolo-Lido – 1971 - Venice, Italy
- Honorary Citizen of Mira – 1971 – Mira-Venice, Italy
- Associate Academician of The Tiberian Academy – 1973 – Rome, Italy
- Parchment of Gratitude – offered by the City of Ravenna for The Divine Comedy in images – 1976 - Ravenna, Italy
- Gold Medal “Tetradrama D’Oro” – offered by The Tiberian Academy – 1977 – Rome, Italy
- The Golden Frame Award art-culture-information– “Cronaca ’77” for contribution to the social elevation of the mankind – 1977 – Rome, Italy
- Honorary member of the Mark Twain Society – 1977 and 1978 – Kirkwood, Missouri, USA
- Nominated “Distinguished Mid-Atlantic Artist” from University of Delaware – 1980 - Newark, USA
- Nominated “Member of The International Association of Art” – UNESCO-Paris, 1981 – Paris, France

== Bibliography ==
- Segato, Giorgio (1988). Eugen Ciuca. Corbo & Fiore, Venice. ISBN 88-7086-027-2
- Ciuca, Eugen (1988). Art’s Fourth Dimension. Corbo & Fiore, Venice. ISBN 88-7086-033-7
