= Plai (Mureș) =

Plai Laposnyak-patak, Lăpușnic
- Location within Romania

Location
- Country: Romania
- Counties: Hunedoara County
- Villages: Stâncești, Rădulești, Lăpușnic

Physical characteristics
- Source: Poiana Ruscă Mountains
- Mouth: Mureș
  - location: Lăpușnic
  - coordinates: 45.9285°N 22.6203°E
- Length: 13 km (8.1 mi)
- Basin size: 26 km^{2} (10 sq mi)

Basin features
- Progression: Mureș→ Tisza→ Danube→ Black Sea

The Plai (also: Lăpușnic, Hungarian: Laposnyak-patak) is a left tributary of the river Mureș in Romania. It discharges into the Mureș in Lăpușnic. Its length is 13 km (8.1 mi) and its basin size is 26 km^{2} (10 sq mi).
