= Pârâul Sărat (Vâlcea) =

- Location within Romania

Location
- Country: Romania
- Counties: Vâlcea County
- Villages: Lunca, Ocnița, Ocnele Mari, Gura Suhașului

Physical characteristics
- Mouth: Olt
  - location: Stolniceni
  - coordinates: 45.0478°N 24.3195°E
- Length: 11 km (6.8 mi)
- Basin size: 26 km^{2} (10 sq mi)

Basin features
- Progression: Olt→ Danube→ Black Sea

The Pârâul Sărat is a right tributary of the river Olt in Romania. It flows into the Olt near Stolniceni, a southern part of Râmnicu Vâlcea. Its length is 11 km (6.8 mi) and its basin size is 26 km^{2} (10 sq mi).
