= Pârâul Pietros =

Pârâul Pietros may refer to:

- Pârâul Pietros, a tributary of the Brădești in Harghita County
- Pârâul Pietros, a tributary of the Vâlcele in Covasna County
- Pârâul Pietros (Vișeu), a tributary of the Vișeu in Maramureș County
