= Piatra (Mureș) =

Piatra Hungarian: Kőpatak, Pârâul Pietrei
- Location within Romania

Location
- Country: Romania
- Counties: Harghita County
- Villages: Remetea

Physical characteristics
- Mouth: Mureș
  - location: Remetea
  - coordinates: 46.7940°N 25.4574°E
- Length: 8 km (5.0 mi)
- Basin size: 22 km^{2} (8.5 sq mi)

Basin features
- Progression: Mureș→ Tisza→ Danube→ Black Sea

The Piatra (also: Pârâul Pietrei, Hungarian: Kőpatak) is a left tributary of the river Mureș in Transylvania, Romania. It discharges into the Mureș in Remetea. Its length is 8 km (5.0 mi) and its basin size is 22 km^{2} (8.5 sq mi). Its name means "Stone Creek" in both languages.
