= Sânmihaiu Almașului =

- Commune
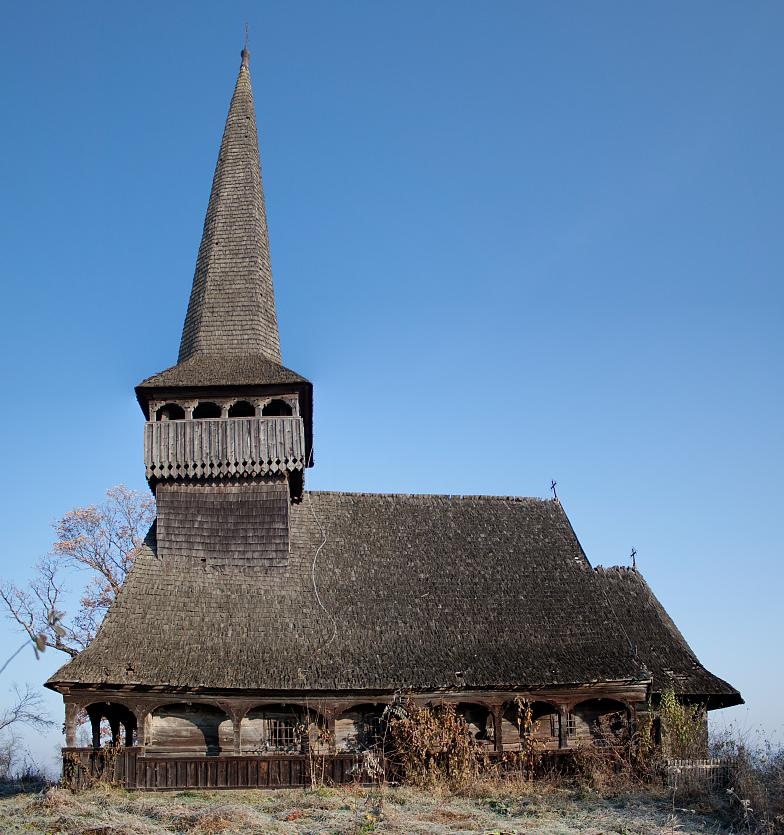
- Wooden church of Sânmihaiu Almașului

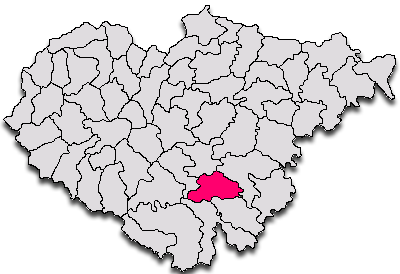
- Location in Sălaj County

- Location in Romania
- Coordinates: 47°02′10″N 23°16′11″E
- Country: Romania
- County: Sălaj

Government
  - Mayor (2020–2024): Cornel Lung (PSD)
- Area: 64.82 km^{2} (25.03 sq mi)
- Elevation: 257 m (843 ft)
- Population (2021-12-01): 1,556
  - Density: 24.00/km^{2} (62.17/sq mi)
- Time zone: UTC+02:00 (EET)
  - Summer (DST): UTC+03:00 (EEST)
- Postal code: 457305
- Area code: +40 x60
- Vehicle reg.: SJ
- Website: sinmihaiualmasului.ro

Sânmihaiu Almașului (Hungarian: Almásszentmihály) is a commune in Sălaj County, Transylvania, Romania. It is composed of three villages: Bercea (Bercse), Sânmihaiu Almașului, and Sântă Măria (Almásszentmária).

== Geography ==
The commune is located in the southern part of Sălaj County, 30 km (19 mi) from the county seat, Zalău. It lies at an altitude of 257 m (843 ft), on the banks of the river Almaș.

Sânmihaiu Almașului sits at the intersection of two national roads. The first one, DN1F (part of European route E81), connects Cluj-Napoca, 56 km (35 mi) to the southeast, to Zalău, and continues to the Hungarian border near Carei. The second one, DN1G, runs from Huedin, 31 km (19 mi) to the southwest, to Jibou, 30 km to the north.

== Sights ==
- Wooden church in Sânmihaiu Almașului (built in the 18th century), historic monument
- Wooden church in Bercea (built in the 19th century)
- Wooden church in Sântă Măria (c.1857)
