= Slobozia, Giurgiu =

Slobozia
- Commune
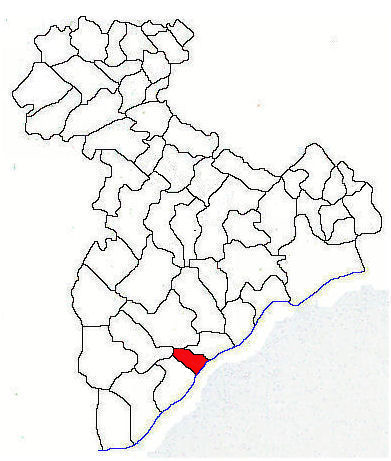
- Location in Giurgiu County

- Location in Romania
- Coordinates: 43°52′N 25°54′E
- Country: Romania
- County: Giurgiu

Government
  - Mayor (2024–2028): Florin-Iulian Gheonu (PSD)
- Elevation: 27 m (89 ft)
- Population (2021-12-01): 2,251
- Time zone: EET/EEST (UTC+2/+3)
- Postal code: 087210
- Area code: +(40) 246
- Vehicle reg.: GR
- Website: primariaslobozia.ro

Slobozia is a commune located in Giurgiu County, Muntenia, Romania. It is composed of a single village, Slobozia.

The Slobozia Solar Park is situated on the administrative territory of the commune.

Historical population
Year	Pop.	±%
2002	2,663	—
2011	2,377	−10.7%
2021	2,251	−5.3%
Source: Census data
