= Găujani =

- Commune
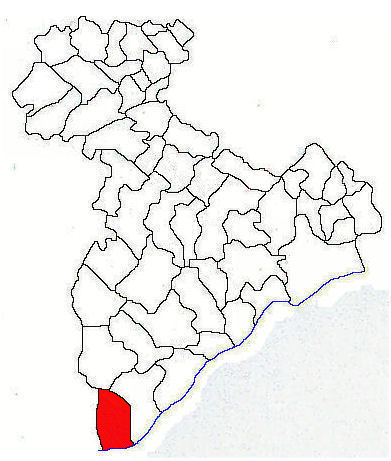
- Location in Giurgiu County

- Location in Romania
- Coordinates: 43°45′N 25°42′E
- Country: Romania
- County: Giurgiu

Government
  - Mayor (2020–2024): Dumitru Marcu (PSD)
- Area: 81.02 km^{2} (31.28 sq mi)
- Elevation: 29 m (95 ft)
- Population (2021-12-01): 2,223
  - Density: 27.44/km^{2} (71.06/sq mi)
- Time zone: EET/EEST (UTC+2/+3)
- Postal code: 87090
- Area code: +(40) 246
- Vehicle reg.: GR
- Website: www.primariagaujani.ro

Găujani is a commune located in Giurgiu County, Muntenia, Romania. It is composed of three villages: Cetățuia, Găujani, and Pietrișu.

The commune is located in the southwestern extremity of the county, on the left bank of the Danube. It lies on the border with Teleorman County and on the border with the Ruse Province of Bulgaria. Găujani is crossed by the DN5C national road, which connects the county seat, Giurgiu, 30 km (19 mi) to the northeast, to Zimnicea, 32 km (20 mi) to the west.

Historical population
Year	Pop.	±%
2002	2,805	—
2011	2,513	−10.4%
2021	2,223	−11.5%
Source: Census data

== Natives ==
- Mariana Nicolesco (1948–2022), operatic soprano
