= Zimbor =

- Commune
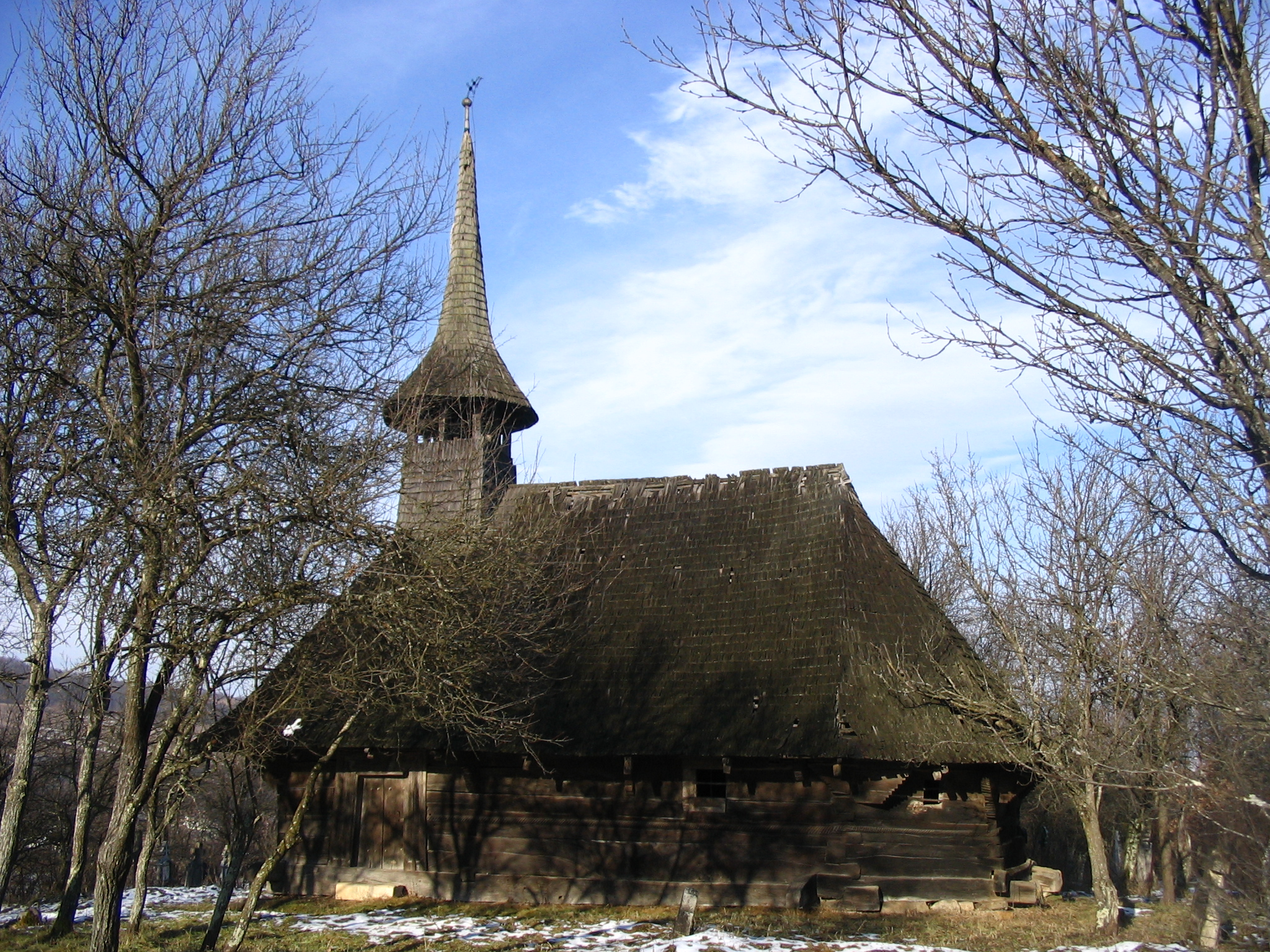
- Wooden Church in Zimbor, historic monument

- Location in Sălaj County

- Location in Romania
- Coordinates: 47°00′08″N 23°15′48″E
- Country: Romania
- County: Sălaj

Government
  - Mayor (2020–2024): Gabriel Mureșan (PNL)
- Area: 74.80 km^{2} (28.88 sq mi)
- Elevation: 269 m (883 ft)
- Population (2021-12-01): 938
  - Density: 12.5/km^{2} (32.5/sq mi)
- Time zone: UTC+02:00 (EET)
  - Summer (DST): UTC+03:00 (EEST)
- Postal code: 457370
- Area code: +(40) 0260
- Vehicle reg.: SJ
- Website: www.comunazimbor.ro

Zimbor (Hungarian: Magyarzsombor) is a commune located in Sălaj County, Romania. It is composed of five villages: Chendremal (Kendermál), Dolu (Almásdál), Sutoru (Zutor), Sâncraiu Almașului (Topaszentkirály), and Zimbor. It is situated in the historical region of Transylvania.

== Sights ==
- Wooden Church in Zimbor, built in the 17th century, historic monument
- Wooden Church in Chendremal, built in the 19th century (1851)
- Zsombory Castle in Zimbor, built in the 19th century, historic monument
- Optatiana, castra in the Roman province of Dacia
