= Durnești =

- Commune
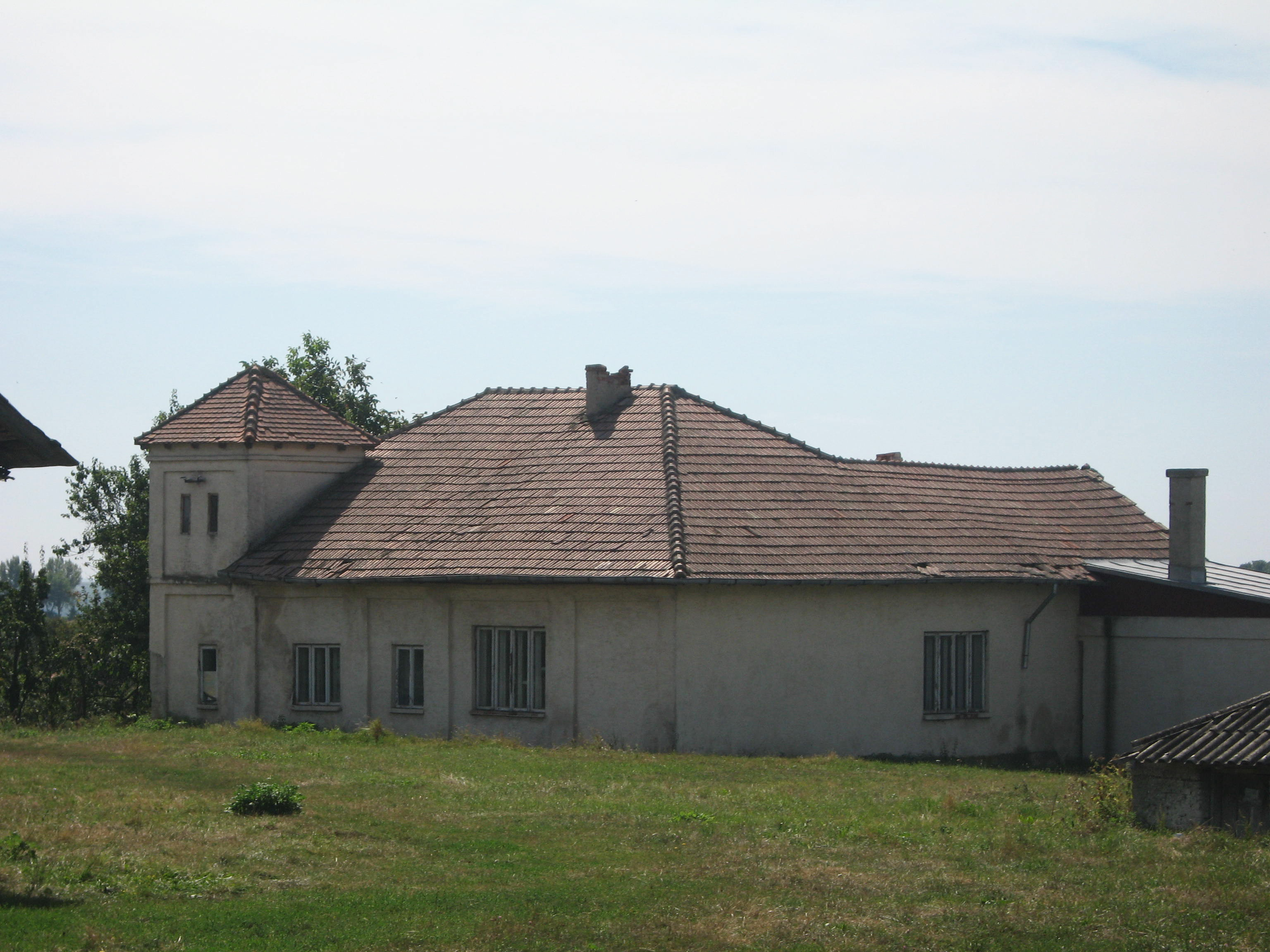

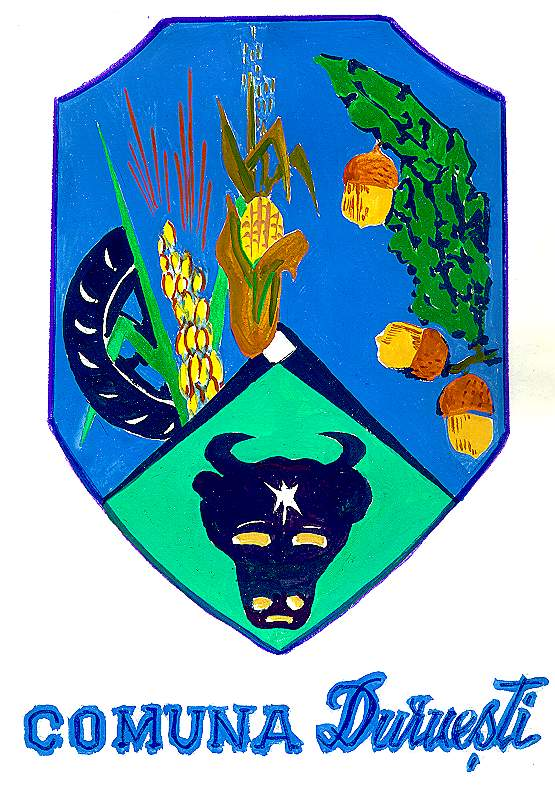
- Coat of arms

- Location in Botoșani County

- Location in Romania
- Coordinates: 47°46′N 27°06′E
- Country: Romania
- County: Botoșani
- Subdivisions: Durnești, Băbiceni, Bârsănești, Broșteni, Cucuteni, Guranda

Government
  - Mayor (2024–2028): Vasile Sasu (PNL)
- Area: 75.02 km^{2} (28.97 sq mi)
- Elevation: 160 m (520 ft)
- Population (2021-12-01): 3,349
  - Density: 44.64/km^{2} (115.6/sq mi)
- Time zone: UTC+02:00 (EET)
  - Summer (DST): UTC+03:00 (EEST)
- Postal code: 717145
- Area code: +40 x31
- Vehicle reg.: BT
- Website: www.primariadurnesti.ro

Durnești is a commune in Botoșani County, Western Moldavia, Romania. It is composed of six villages: Băbiceni, Bârsănești, Broșteni, Cucuteni, Durnești and Guranda.
