= Almașu =

Almașu Váralmás
- Commune
- Orthodox church in Mesteacănu

- Location in Sălaj County

- Location in Romania
- Coordinates: 46°56′N 23°8′E
- Country: Romania
- County: Sălaj

Government
  - Mayor (2020–2024): István Gál-Máté (UDMR)
- Area: 159.7 km^{2} (61.7 sq mi)
- Elevation: 312 m (1,024 ft)
- Population (2021-12-01): 1,882
  - Density: 11.78/km^{2} (30.52/sq mi)
- Time zone: UTC+02:00 (EET)
  - Summer (DST): UTC+03:00 (EEST)
- Postal code: 457010
- Area code: +(40) x59
- Vehicle reg.: SJ
- Website: comunaalmasu.ro

Almașu (Hungarian: Váralmás) is a commune located in Sălaj County, Transylvania, Romania. It is composed of nine villages: Almașu, Băbiu (Bábony), Cutiș (Kiskökényes), Jebucu (Zsobok), Mesteacănu (Almásnyíres), Petrinzel (Kispetri), Sfăraș (Farnas), Stana (Sztána), and Țăudu (Cold).

== Sights ==
- Reformed Church in Almașu (built in the 15th century), historic monument
- Reformed Church in Stana (built in the 17th century), historic monument
- Csáky Castle in Almașu (built in the 19th century), historic monument
- Almașu Citadel, medieval fortress built in the 13th century, historic monument
