= Hida, Sălaj =

Hida
- Commune
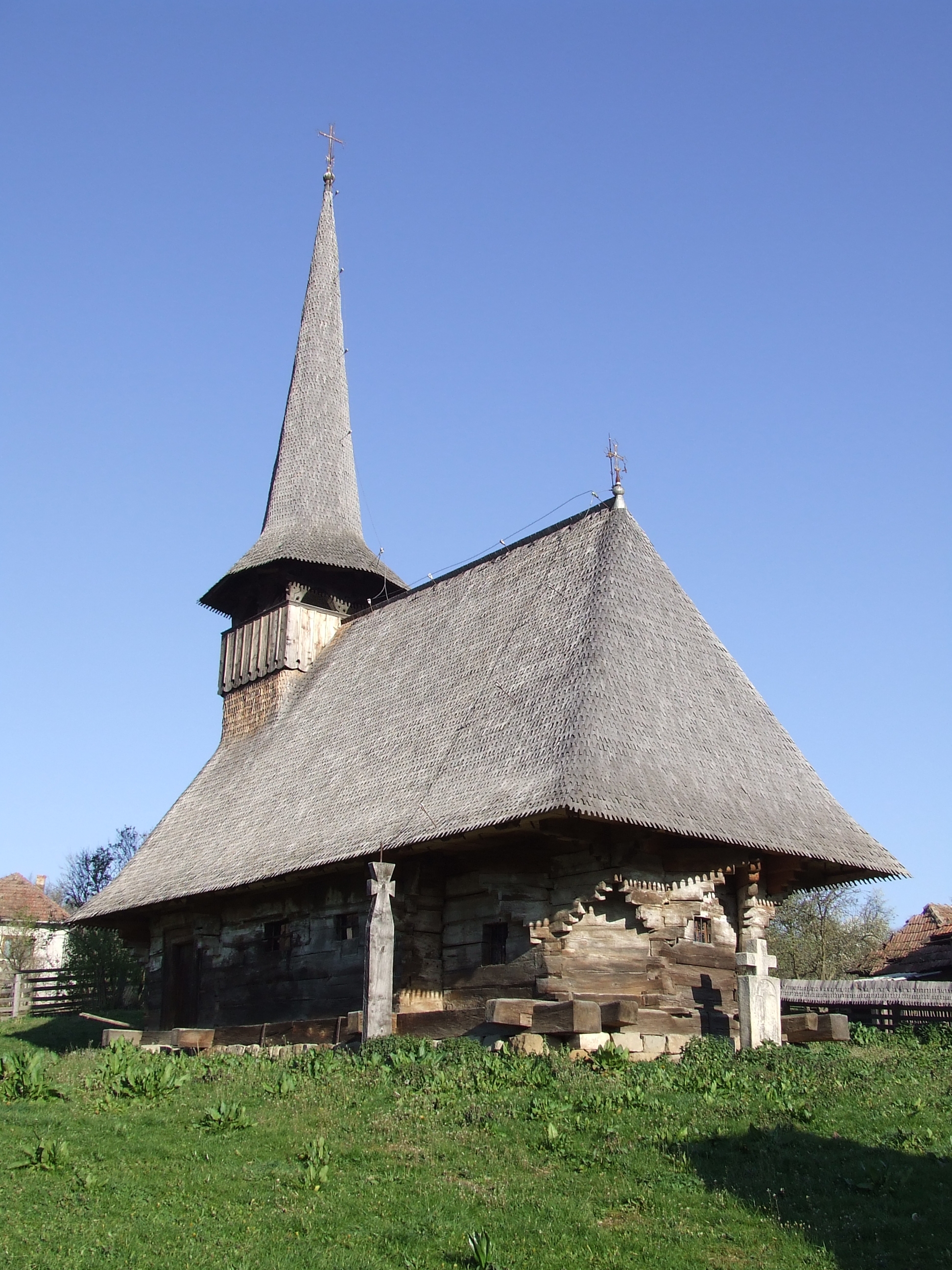
- Wooden Church in Baica

- Coat of arms

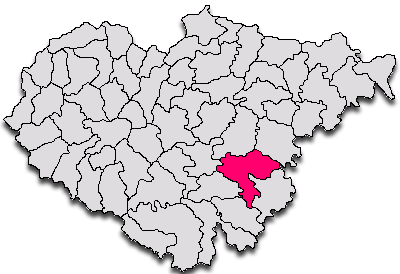
- Location in Sălaj County

- Location in Romania
- Coordinates: 47°03′43″N 23°18′32″E
- Country: Romania
- County: Sălaj

Government
  - Mayor (2020–2024): Dumitru Petruș (PNL)
- Area: 101.72 km^{2} (39.27 sq mi)
- Elevation: 252 m (827 ft)
- Population (2021-12-01): 2,869
  - Density: 28.20/km^{2} (73.05/sq mi)
- Time zone: UTC+02:00 (EET)
  - Summer (DST): UTC+03:00 (EEST)
- Postal code: 457175
- Area code: +(40) 0260
- Vehicle reg.: SJ
- Website: comunahida.ro

Hida (Hungarian: Hidalmás; Yiddish: הידאלמאש, romanized: Hidalmash) is a commune located in Sălaj County, Transylvania, Romania. It is composed of eight villages: Baica (Bányika), Hida, Miluani (Milvány), Păduriș (Tyikló), Racâș (Almásrákos), Sânpetru Almașului (Füzesszentpéter), Stupini (Füzes), and Trestia (Komlósújfalu).

== Miluani ==
The village of Miluani had 112 inhabitants in 2002 and is known for its grain and sunflower production. The settlement was first mentioned in Hungarian documents in 1320 as Miluad. From the 13th century the area was property of the Hungarian Zsombor clan. In the 14th century it was donated to the Elefánthy family. A Romanian Orthodox church was built in the 16th century and a new one in 1920. Miluani is the filia of the Roman Catholic parish of Chidea; traditionally its vicars were Franciscans until 1897. Local Unitarians also belongs to Chidea. Miluani was also a center of the Greek-Catholic arch-deaconry.

Miluani historically was part of Transylvania within the Kingdom of Hungary. It belonged to Doboka County until 1876, when it was incorporated into Kolozs County. After the collapse of Austria-Hungary at the end of World War I and the declaration of the Union of Transylvania with Romania in December 1918, the Romanian Army took control of the area in April 1919, during the Hungarian–Romanian War. The village officially became part of the territory ceded to the Kingdom of Romania in June 1920 under the terms of the Treaty of Trianon. In August 1940, under the auspices of Nazi Germany, which imposed the Second Vienna Award, Hungary retook the territory of Northern Transylvania (which included Miluani) from Romania. In 1944, ethnic Romanian rebels of Miluani burnt up the Hungarian Reformed Church's archive in Hida. The Jewish population of Hidalmás (26% in 1910) was deported to the Auschwitz concentration camp by the Hungarian government in May 1944. Towards the end of World War II, the area was taken back from Hungarian and German troops by Romanian and Soviet forces in October 1944.

Among those who have resided in the village include Sándor Kendi, a Hungarian magnate and József Nyírő, a Hungarian writer and politician, and vicar in Miluani.

== Natives ==
- Eugen Ciucă (1913–2005), Romanian-American sculptor and painter

== Sights ==
- Wooden Church in Baica, built in the 17th century (1645), historic monument
- Wooden Church in Hida, built in the 18th century (1717), historic monument
- Wooden Church in Racâș, built in the 16th century (1558), historic monument
- Wooden Church in Sânpetru Almașului, built in the 18th century (1795), historic monument
- Orthodox Church in Miluani, built in the 16th century, historic monument
- Hida, Manor Hatfaludy, built in the 20th century (1916), historic monument
- Hida, Devil's Rock Nature reserve (Natural monument)
- Meadow with daffodils from Racâș-Hida, Natural reserve
