= Cuzăplac =

- Commune
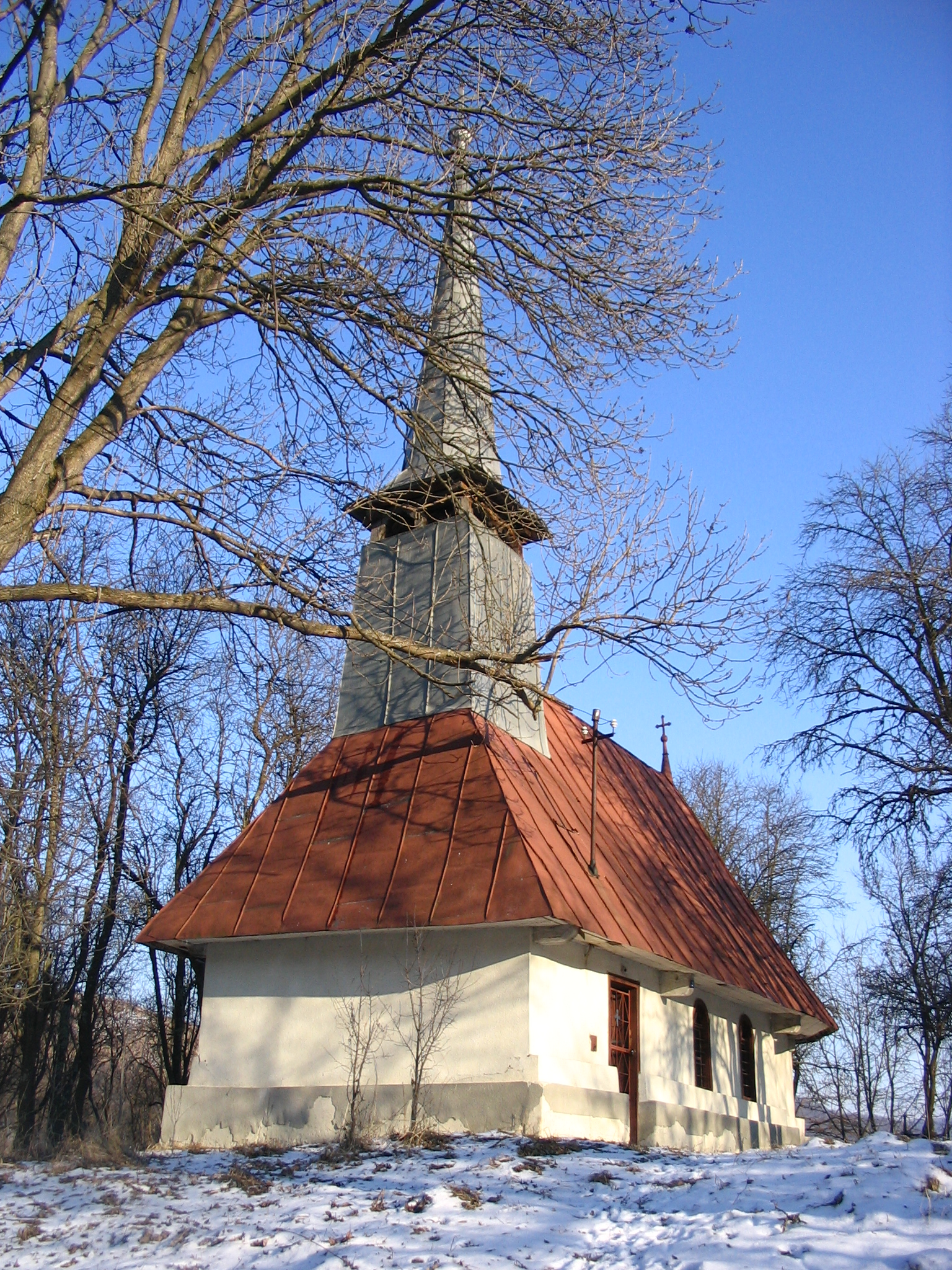
- Wooden Church in Cubleșu

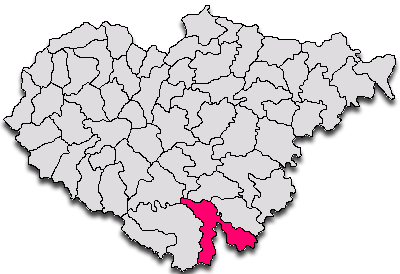
- Location in Sălaj County

- Location in Romania
- Coordinates: 46°58′N 23°12′E
- Country: Romania
- County: Sălaj

Government
  - Mayor (2020–2024): Mircea Pop (PNL)
- Area: 109.14 km^{2} (42.14 sq mi)
- Elevation: 289 m (948 ft)
- Population (2021-12-01): 1,560
  - Density: 14.3/km^{2} (37.0/sq mi)
- Time zone: UTC+02:00 (EET)
  - Summer (DST): UTC+03:00 (EEST)
- Postal code: 457110
- Area code: +40 x59
- Vehicle reg.: SJ
- Website: www.primariacuzaplac.ro

Cuzăplac (Hungarian: Középlak) is a commune located in Sălaj County, Transylvania, Romania. It is composed of eight villages: Cubleșu (Almásköblös), Cuzăplac, Gălășeni (Tóttelke), Mierța (Nyerce), Petrindu (Nagypetri), Ruginoasa (Lapupatak), Stoboru (Vásártelke), and Tămașa (Almástamási).

The commune is located at the southern extremity of Sălaj County, 41 km (25 mi) from the county seat, Zalău, on the border with Cluj County. It is crossed by national road DN1G, which runs from Huedin, 20 km (12 mi) to the southwest, to Jibou, 41 km to the north. The Gălășeni train station serves the CFR Main Line 300, which connects Bucharest to Cluj-Napoca and on to the Hungarian border near Oradea.

== Sights ==
- Wooden Church in Cubleșu, built in the late 18th century, historic monument
- Wooden Church in Mierța, built in 1857
- Wooden Church in Stoboru, built in the late 18th century
- Reformed Church in Petrindu, built in the late 18th century, historic monument
