= Pietrosu =

Pietrosu (meaning "rocky") may refer to several places in Romania:

- Pietrosu, a village in Costești Commune, Buzău County
- Pietrosu, a village in Tătăruși Commune, Iași County
- Pietrosu, a village in Oniceni Commune, Neamț County

and to a village in Moldova:

- Pietrosu, Fălești, a commune in Fălești district

and three mountain peaks in Romania:

- Pietrosu Peak (Rodna), Rodna Mountains, Maramureș County (2303 m)
- Pietrosu Peak (Călimani), Călimani Mountains, Suceava/Mureș County (2100 m)
- Pietrosu Peak (Bistrița), Bistrița Mountains, Suceava County (1791 m)

and the following rivers in Romania:

- Pietrosu, a tributary of the Bârzava in Caraș-Severin County
- Pietrosu, a tributary of the Cracăul Alb in Neamț County
- Pietrosu, a tributary of the Dobrovăț in Iași County
- Pietrosu, a tributary of the Orăștie in Hunedoara County
- Pietrosu, a tributary of the Păscoaia in Vâlcea County

== See also ==
- Pietrosul (disambiguation)
- Pârâul Pietros (disambiguation)
