= List of rivers of Romania: I–K =

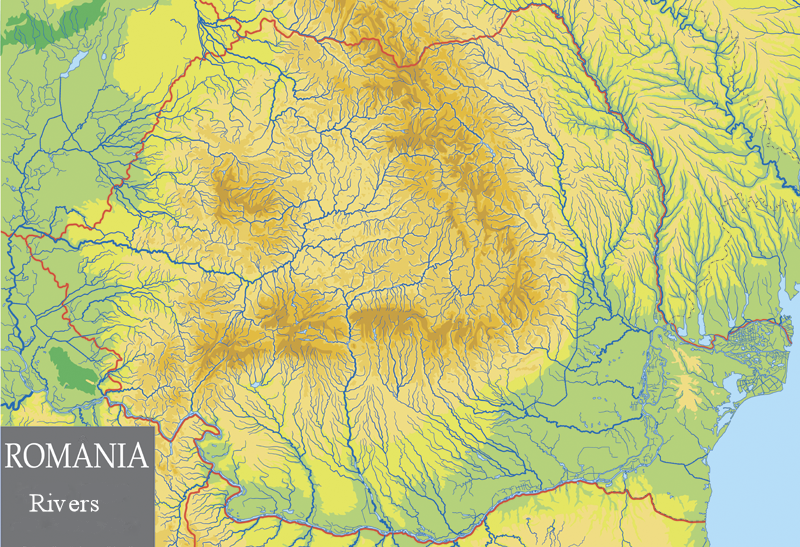
Map of Romania's hydrographic network

== I ==
River	Tributary of
Iacoberi	Teuz
Iad	Crișul Repede
Iadăra	Someș
Ialomicioara	Ialomița (left tributary)
Ialomicioara	Ialomița (right tributary)
Ialomița	Danube
Iapa	Bistrița
Iara	Arieș
Iarcoș	Timiș
Iaslovăț	Solca
Iauna	Cerna
Iavardi	Valea Rece
Iaz	Barcău
Ibana	Simila
Ibăneasa	Jijia
Icland	Lechința

River	Tributary of
Icui	Bega
Idicel	Mureș
Idiciu	Cund
Iepureni	Jijia
Ier	Barcău
Iercici	Apa Mare
Ierța	Iara
Ierul Îngust	Ier
Ieud	Iza
Iezer	Tutova
Igăzău	Pogăniș
Ighiu	Ampoi
Ijdileni	Chineja
Ilba	Someș
Ileanda	Someș
Ilfov	Dâmbovița

River	Tributary of
Ilfovăț	Neajlov
Ilișești	Suceava
Ilișoara Mare	Ilva
Ilișua	Someșul Mare
Ilva	Mureș
Ilva	Someșul Mare
Iminog	Olt
Inaru	Crișul Pietros
Inot	Barcău
Inzel	Aiud
Iod	Mureș
Iordana	Câlniștea
Ip	Barcău
Ismar	Câlniștea
Isnovăț	Prut
Isticeu	Gurghiu

River	Tributary of
Istria	Black Sea
Iuhod	Târnava Mică
Iza	Tisza
Izvoarele	Vedea
Izvor	Crișul Repede
Izvor	Jiu
Izvor	Mureș
Izvor	Neajlov
Izvorul Alb	Asău
Izvorul Alb	Moldova
Izvorul Dorului	Prahova
Izvorul Dragoș	Vișeu
Izvorul Gotia	Lotru
Izvorul Mircii	Buda
Izvorul Muntelui	Bistrița
Izvorul Negru	Uz

== J ==
River	Tributary of
Jaleș	Tismana
Jaravăț	Bârlad
Jardașița Mare	Cerna
Jebuc	Almaș
Jelerău	Cerna
Jghiab	Slănic
Jidoaia	Voineșița

River	Tributary of
Jidoștița	Danube
Jieț	Danube
Jieț	Jiul de Est
Jijia	Prut
Jijila	Danube
Jijioara	Jijia
Jilț	Jiu

River	Tributary of
Jilțul Mic	Jilț
Jilțul Slivilești	Jilț
Jirnov	Dâmbovnic
Jitin	Caraș
Jiu	Danube
Jiul de Est	Jiu
Jiul de Vest	Jiu

River	Tributary of
Jolotca	Mureș
Judele	Râul Mare
Jugălia	Oltișor
Julița	Mureș
Junc	Crișul Alb
Jupâneasa	Bănița

== K ==
River	Tributary of
Karaš (Caraș)	Danube
