= Izvorul =

Izvorul may refer to the following places:

== Rivers in Romania ==
- Izvorul Bogat, a tributary of the Tecșe in Covasna County
- Izvorul Căldării, a tributary of the Râul Mare
- Izvorul Coastelor, a tributary of the Topolog in Argeș County
- Izvorul Dimei, a tributary of the Vâlsan in Argeș County
- Izvorul Dorului, a tributary of the Prahova in Prahova County
- Izvorul Dragoșu, headwater of the Bughea in Argeș County
- Izvorul Foișorului, a tributary of the Dâmbovița in Argeș County
- Izvorul Groșilor, a tributary of the Râul Doamnei in Argeș County
- Izvorul Hotarului, a tributary of the Dâmbovița in Argeș County
- Izvorul Iezerului, a tributary of the Târnava in Alba County
- Izvorul Lerescu, a tributary of the Bârsa in Brașov County
- Izvorul Lung, a tributary of the Bistrița in Bistrița-Năsăud County
- Izvorul Mare, a tributary of the Anieș in Bistrița-Năsăud County
- Izvorul Mare, a tributary of the Caraș in Caraș-Severin County
- Izvorul Mare, a tributary of the Repedea in Vâlcea County
- Izvorul Mioarelor, a tributary of the Râul Doamnei in Argeș County
- Izvorul Mircii, a tributary of the Buda in Argeș County
- Izvorul Negovanului, headwater of the Sădurel in Sibiu County
- Izvorul Popii, a tributary of the Vâlsan in Argeș County
- Izvorul Porcului, a tributary of the Zârna in Argeș County
- Izvorul Războiului, a tributary of the Bâsca Mică in Buzău County
- Izvorul Roșu, a tributary of the Pârâul Băilor in Bistrița-Năsăud County
- Izvorul Roșu, a tributary of the Văsălatu in Argeș County
- Izvorul Sașa, a tributary of the Călinești in Vâlcea County
- Izvorul Surlei, a tributary of the Râul Doamnei in Argeș County
- Izvorul Tomnatecului, a tributary of the Lotrioara in Sibiu County
- Izvorul Vacii, a tributary of the Sădurel in Sibiu County
- Izvorul Zănoaga, headwater of the Bughea in Argeș County
- Izvorul Zănoagei, a tributary of the Brătei in Dâmbovița County

== Other ==
- Lake Izvorul Muntelui, the largest artificial lake on the interior waters of Romania

== See also ==
- Izvor (disambiguation)
- Izvoare (disambiguation)
- Izvoarele (disambiguation)
- Izvorașu River (disambiguation)
- Izvorul Alb (disambiguation)
- Izvorul cu Hotar River (disambiguation)
- Izvorul Gropii (disambiguation)
- Izvorul Negru (disambiguation)
