= Pietroșani, Argeș =

Pietroșani
- Commune
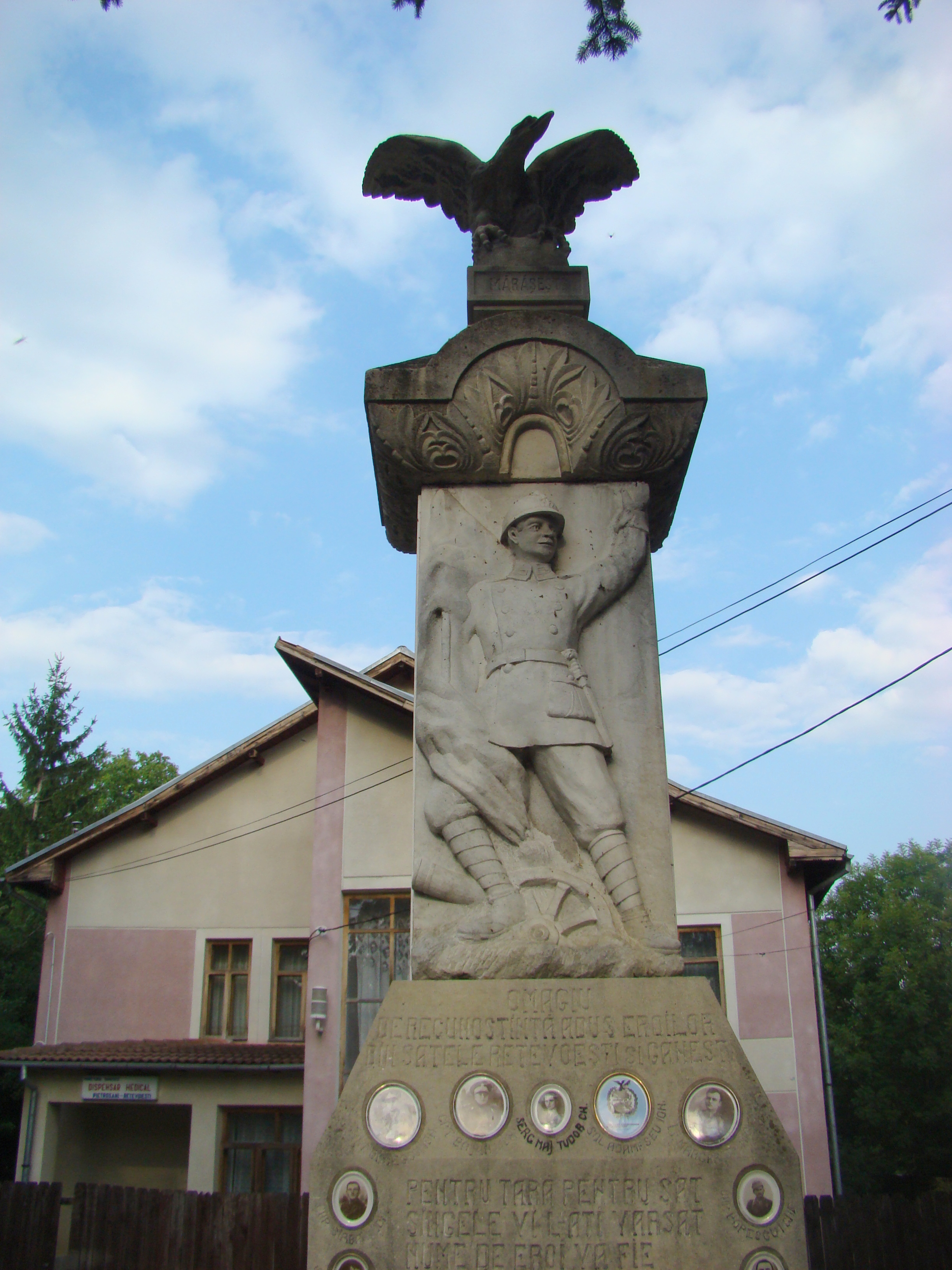
- World War I memorial

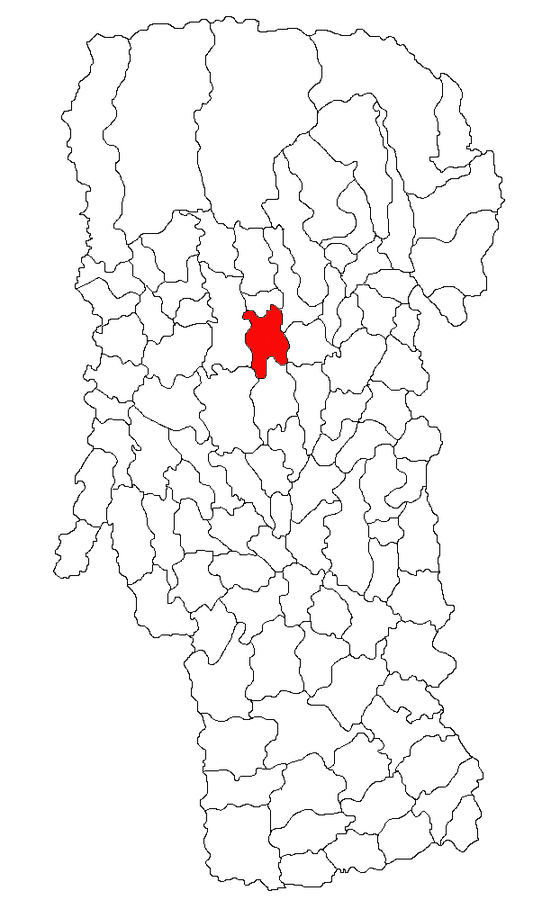
- Location in Argeș County

- Location in Romania
- Coordinates: 45.1548°N 24.8442°E
- Country: Romania
- County: Argeș

Government
  - Mayor (2024–2028): Eugeniu Pătru (PSD)
- Area: 50 km^{2} (19 sq mi)
- Elevation: 442 m (1,450 ft)
- Population (2021-12-01): 5,320
  - Density: 110/km^{2} (280/sq mi)
- Time zone: UTC+02:00 (EET)
  - Summer (DST): UTC+03:00 (EEST)
- Postal code: 117550
- Area code: +(40) 248
- Vehicle reg.: AG
- Website: www.primariacomuneipietrosani.ro

Pietroșani is a commune in Argeș County, Muntenia, Romania. It is composed of five villages: Bădești, Gănești, Pietroșani, Retevoiești, and Vărzăroaia.

The commune is situated in the southern foothills of the Făgăraș Mountains, at an altitude of 442 m (1,450 ft), on the banks of Râul Doamnei and its right tributary, Valea Ruzii. It is located in the central-north part of Argeș County, 28 km (17 mi) southwest of Câmpulung and 38 km (24 mi) north of the county seat, Pitești.

Pietroșani is crossed by county road DJ731, which connects it to the north with Domnești, Corbi, and Nucșoara, and to the south with Coșești and Dârmănești, where it ends in DN73.
