= Izvorașu River =

Izvorașu River may refer to:

- Izvorașu, a tributary of the Bega Poienilor in Timiș County
- Izvorașu, a tributary of the Izvorul Dorului in Prahova County

== See also ==
- Izvor River (disambiguation)
- Izvorul River (disambiguation)
- Izvoare River (disambiguation)
- Izvoarele River (disambiguation)
