= Izvor =

Izvor (Bulgarian, Macedonian, Romanian and Serbian for "Spring") may refer to:

== Bulgaria ==
- Izvor, Vidin Province, a village in Dimovo Municipality
- Izvor, Burgas Province, a village in Burgas Municipality
- Izvor, Pernik Province, a village in Radomir Municipality
- Izvor, Plovdiv Province, a village in Rodopi Municipality
- Izvor, Sofia Province, a village in Slivnitsa Municipality
- Izvor, old name for Kabale, a village in Tundzha Municipality, Yambol Province

== North Macedonia ==
- Izvor, Čaška, a village in the Čaška Municipality
- Izvor, Kičevo, a village in the Kičevo Municipality
- Izvor, Lipkovo, a village in the Lipkovo Municipality

== Romania ==
- Izvor, a village in Cornereva Commune, Caraș-Severin County
- Izvor, a village in Șimnicu de Sus Commune, Dolj County
- Izvor metro station, a metro station in Bucharest
- Izvor (Crișul Repede), a tributary of the Crișul Repede in Bihor County
- Izvor, a tributary of the Jitin in Caraș-Severin County
- Izvor (Jiu), a tributary of the Jiu in Hunedoara County
- Izvor (Mureș), a tributary of the Mureș in Arad County
- Izvor (Neajlov), a tributary of the Neajlov in Dâmbovița County

== Serbia ==
- Izvor (Babušnica), a village in Babušnica Municipality
- Izvor (Bosilegrad), a village in Bosilegrad Municipality
- Izvor (Paraćin), a village in Paraćin Municipality
- Izvor (Pirot), a village in Pirot Municipality
- Izvor (Svrljig), a village in Svrljig Municipality
- Izvor (Žitorađa), a village in Žitorađa Municipality
- Izvor (Novo Brdo), a village in Novo Brdo Municipality

== Other uses ==
- Izvor (album), a 2018 studio album by Macedonian singer Karolina Gočeva

== See also ==
- Izvori (disambiguation)
- Izvorul (disambiguation)
- Izvoarele (disambiguation)
