= Râul Doamnei =

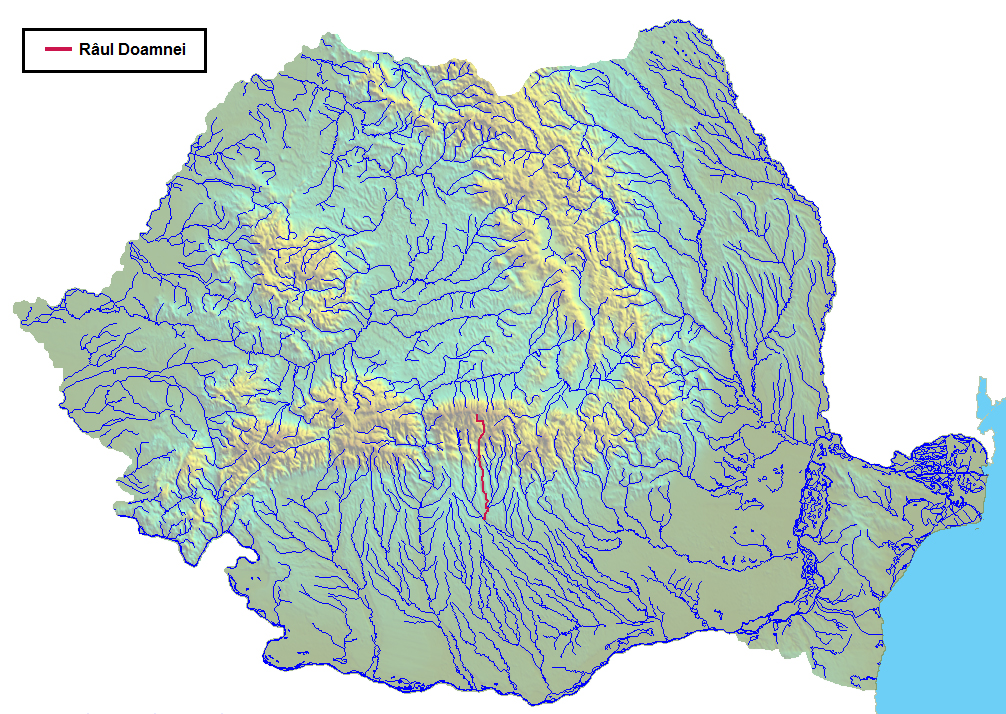

- Location within Romania

Location
- Country: Romania
- Counties: Argeș County

Physical characteristics
- Source: Făgăraș Mountains
- Mouth: Argeș
  - location: Pitești
  - coordinates: 44.8625°N 24.8863°E
- Length: 107 km (66 mi)
- Basin size: 1,836 km^{2} (709 sq mi)

Basin features
- Progression: Argeș→ Danube→ Black Sea
- Tributaries
  - left: Râul Târgului

Râul Doamnei is a left tributary of the river Argeș in Romania. Its source is on the eastern slope of Moldoveanu Peak (Făgăraș Mountains), the highest mountain peak in Romania. It discharges into the Argeș just north of Pitești. Its upper course, upstream from the confluence with the Zârna, is also called Valea Rea. Its length is 107 km (66 mi) and its basin size is 1,836 km^{2} (709 sq mi). It frequently dries up in summer, owing to the works upstream that have redirected part of its water supply toward a reservoir serving the hydroelectric plant on the Argeș.

Râul Doamnei flows through a hilly region, forming narrow strips of fertile plain on both of its banks. The following towns and villages are situated along the river Râul Doamnei, from source to mouth: Slatina, Sboghițești, Corbi, Domnești, Pietroșani, Coșești, Dârmănești, Purcăreni, Colibași and Ștefănești.

== Name ==
The stream's name literally means "the lady's river", or "the princess's river". Râul is Romanian for "The river". As such, it may form part of the Romanian names given in full for virtually all rivers. However, since Doamnei is the genitive of Doamnă ("a lady"), Râul is part of the name itself in this case.

== Tributaries ==
The following rivers are tributaries to the Râul Doamnei (from source to mouth):

- Left: Izvorul Bândea, Dara, Boureț, Zârna, Văsălat, Baciu, Izvorul Surlei, Murgu, Jangu, Izvorul Mioarelor, Izvorul Groșilor, Slatina, Valea Păcurarului, Râul Târgului, Adâncata, Valea Mare
- Right: Pojarna, Furfuescu, Șipotele, Drăghina Mare, Cernat, Micești (Păuleasca), Budeasa

== History ==
According to legend, the first wife of Wallachian Prince Vlad III the Impaler died during the 1462 siege of Poenari Castle by an Ottoman army led by Vlad's half-brother Radu cel Frumos.

A former servant of Vlad, held as a prisoner and servant to the Ottomans but still loyal to the Prince, having seen the shadow of Vlad's wife behind a window and shot an arrow in that direction, with a message informing that the Ottoman army was going to attack the castle the next morning. Upon reading the message, Vlad's wife flung herself off the castle's tower and into the stream below the castle, preferring death to Ottoman captivity. The stream was then named in recollection of the event. A fictionalized version of these events is depicted in the 1992 film Bram Stoker's Dracula, although in the film, the river the princess throws herself into is the Argeș itself.

The ecosystem of the river was affected by the building of the reservoir on the Argeș. Before its building, Romanichthys valsanicola, an endemic fish species, used to populate this river. Currently, this species, listed as critically endangered, is only found along a 1 km stretch of the river Vâlsan.
