= Micești (disambiguation) =

Micești may refer to several places in Romania:

- Micești, a commune in Argeș County
- Micești, a village in Alba Iulia municipality, Alba County
- Micești, a village in Tureni Commune, Cluj County
- Casele Micești, a village in Feleacu Commune, Cluj County
- Micești (river), a tributary of the Râul Doamnei in Argeș County

== See also ==
- Mica (disambiguation)
- Miculești (disambiguation)
