= Istrate Micescu =

Romanian lawyer, professor and politician (1881–1951)

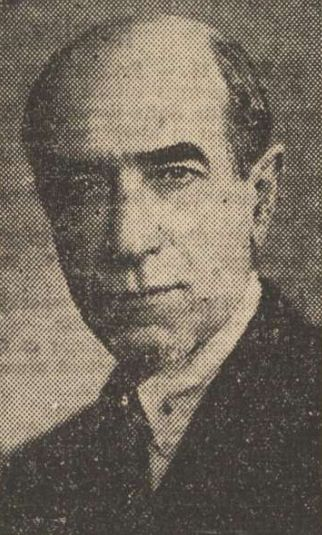
- Micescu in a photo published in 1937

Minister of Foreign Affairs of Romania
- In office 29 December 1937 – 10 February 1938
- Prime Minister: Octavian Goga
- Preceded by: Victor Antonescu
- Succeeded by: Gheorghe Tătărescu

Minister of Justice of Romania
- In office 24 November 1939 – 30 November 1939
- Prime Minister: Gheorghe Tătărescu
- Preceded by: Victor Iamandi
- Succeeded by: Aurelian Bentoiu

Personal details
- Born: 22 May 1881 Ploiești, Kingdom of Romania
- Died: 22 May 1951 (aged 70) Aiud Prison, Romanian People's Republic
- Resting place: Mărăcineni, Argeș County, Romania
- Party: National Liberal Party; National Christian Party; National Renaissance Front
- Spouses: Elena Valimarescu (died 1919) Anișoara Munteanu (div. 1930) Elisabeta Pastia (after 1930)
- Children: Roger, Mariana, Istrate Jr.
- Parents: Nicolae Micescu (father); Maria Rădulescu (mother)
- Education: Sorbonne University
- Occupation: Lawyer, professor, politician
- Known for: 1938 Constitution of Romania

Military service
- Allegiance: Kingdom of Romania
- Branch/service: Army
- Rank: Lieutenant
- Battles/wars: Battle of Mărășești
- Employer(s): University of Iași; University of Bucharest

Istrate N. Micescu (22 May 1881 – 22 May 1951) was a Romanian lawyer, Law and Political Science professor at the University of Bucharest's Law Department, and politician who served as the Minister of Foreign Affairs of Romania.

== Early life and education ==
Micescu was born on 22 May 1881 in Ploiești to one of the families of the nobility in Romania, son of professor and liberal politician Nicolae Micescu and Maria Rădulescu. After graduating in 1899 from the Ion Brătianu High School in Pitești, he studied for a semester at the University of Bucharest. He then went to Sorbonne University in Paris to study law and philology, obtaining his Law degree magna cum laude in 1906.

== Career ==
Upon returning to Romania, Micescu practiced Law, first at the Argeș County bar, and then at the Ilfov County bar. In 1907 he competed against Nicolae Titulescu for an open faculty position at the Law School of the University of Iași, and was successful in securing the appointment. He later transferred to the University of Bucharest, where he was appointed Professor of Civil Law. During World War I, he served as lieutenant in the Romanian Army, and was wounded at the Battle of Mărășești in 1917.

In 1918, he joined the National Liberal Party of Romania and was a deputy in the Parliament of Romania in 1920, 1927, and 1931. In 1931 Micescu was elected vice-president of the Chamber of Deputies. He was also senator, first for Muscel and then Ploiești. He served as Dean of the Ilfov Bar Association (which includes Bucharest), first in 1923–1926, and then in 1936.

Micescu was antisemitic. He formed a group called the Association of Romanian Christian Lawyers, and in November 1935 he made an alliance with Corneliu Zelea Codreanu's fascistic Iron Guard in order to intimidate his political opponents in the Bucharest Bar Association. Micescu was one of the main antisemitic instigators in the Bar Association and, on 7 February 1937 he presided the Bar when it decided to no longer admit Jewish lawyers. After Legionary students helped him gain control of the Ilfov Bar Association, Micescu made denigrating remarks about Codreanu’s electoral alliances in 1937; Codreanu launched a libel suit against Micescu, but in December 1937 he lost the suit.

Micescu's antisemitism led him to leave the National Liberal Party and join Octavian Goga's National Christian Party. On 29 December 1937, he was appointed Minister of Foreign Affairs of Romania in the Goga cabinet. He served as Foreign Minister until 10 February 1938.

Micescu was the author of the 1938 Constitution of Romania, which established the monarchic regime of King Carol II of Romania. He began working on the constitution in mid-February and completed it in 3 days. Although he had previously praised Micescu as being "an eminent jurist," Nicolae Iorga was not pleased with the result: "Our Constitution should be the product of the nation, relying on strict principles of the soul and the manifestations of our people. Our first Constitution was created by a certain Alecu Constantinescu, and that of last February by Istrate Micescu, an idiotic jurist who only sees that which is written in his manuals and that which the king has told him." In December, the National Renaissance Front was formed as the only legally permitted party; Micescu became a member of the ruling council of the party, and a Senator in the new Parliament.

In late November 1939, Micescu served for a week as Minister of Justice in the Fifth Tătărăscu cabinet. As head of the Ministry of Justice he promoted and brutally enacted antisemitic laws.

== Imprisonment and death ==
In 1945, after the communist-led government of Petru Groza came to power, Micescu was disbarred. According to some accounts, King Michael I offered safe passage to the West on his personal plane so that Micescu could set up a government-in-exile, but he refused. He was arrested on 6 July 1947 and interrogated at the Ministry of Internal Affairs. He was re-arrested in March 1948 and held at Jilava Prison on charges that he and Nichifor Robu had set an organization (Salvarea Neamului) to overthrow the communist regime. He was tried by the Bucharest Military Tribunal, presided by Colonel Mihail Vasilescu; on 1 July 1948 he was sentenced to 20 years of forced labour for conspiracy and rebellion. He was sent to Aiud Prison, where he died three years later, of complications due to a prostate condition and poor medical care. He was buried by his family next to the church located on his property at Ciumești, Argeș County.

A street in Pitești now bears his name.

== Private life ==
Micescu was married 3 times: to Elena Valimarescu, Anișoara Munteanu, and Elisabeta Pastia. He had 3 children: Roger Micescu (love child, born to his Swedish servant in Paris, but raised by him without the mother's input), Mariana Micescu (with the first wife), and Istrate Micescu Jr. (with the second wife).

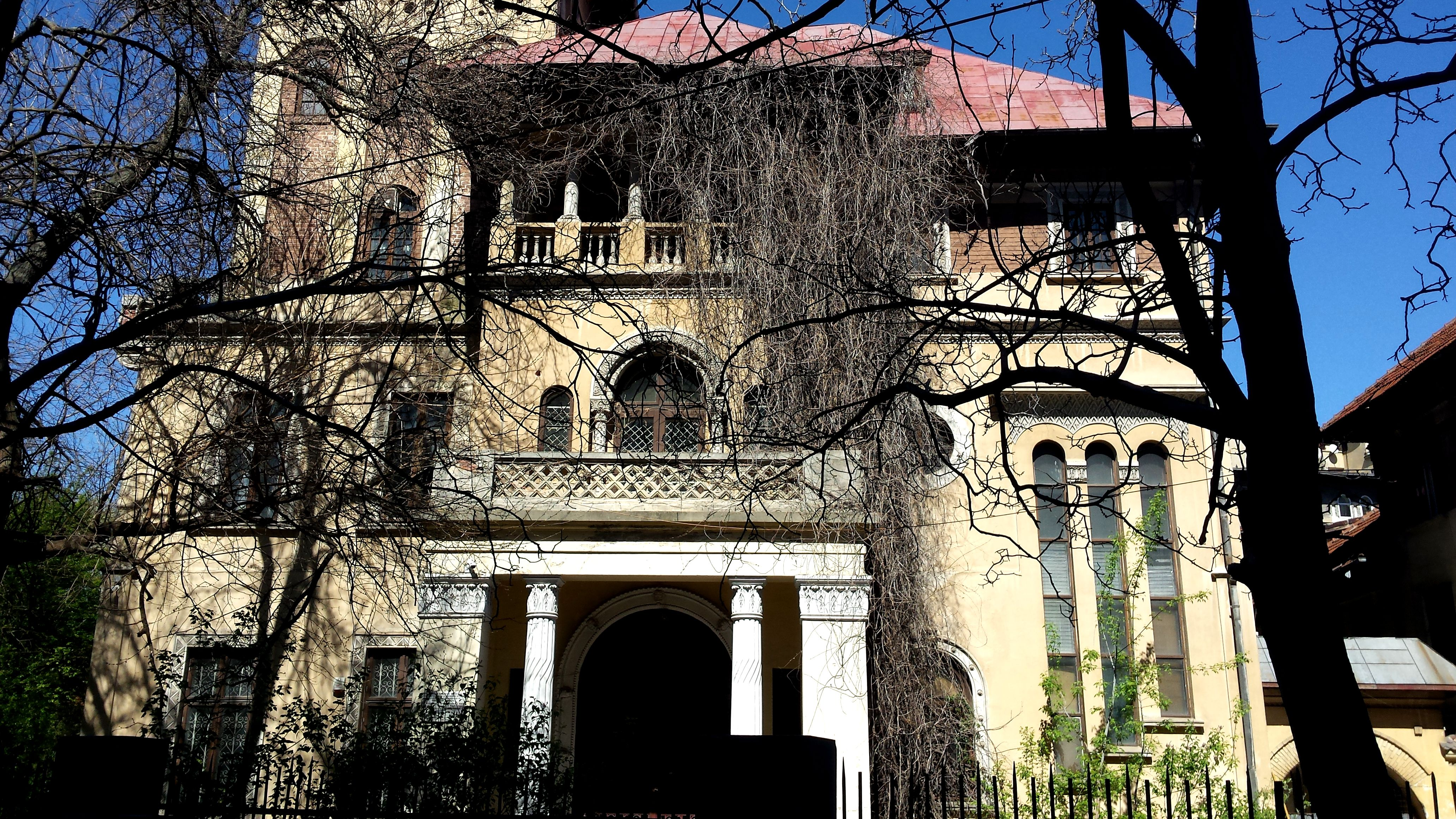
The Istrate Micescu House, at the southeastern entrance to the Cișmigiu Gardens

Micescu lived in an imposing mansion at the entrance to the Cișmigiu Gardens in Bucharest; the property, located at 12, Ioan Zalomit Street, featured the largest private library in the city. Bound to the land by a passion that had to do with a feudal notion of property, Istrate Micescu used to invest his earnings in small properties, some of which did not return any income. He particularly cared for the one in Ciumești (now Argeșelu, in Mărăcineni commune, in the vicinity of Micești), where the roots of his family were and where he had his most beautiful mansion built.

His most famous property was the Micești mansion, built in 1928 in Neo-Romanian style. The plans were drawn by architect Edmond van Saanen Algi and the building contractor was the well-known engineer C. Corani. Istrate Micescu would invite at his property his friends, including the writers Liviu Rebreanu, Ion Minulescu, Lucian Blaga, and Octavian Goga. He gathered there a valuable library, as well as painting by Jean Alexandru Steriadi, Nicolae Tonitza, Nicolae Grigorescu, and Ștefan Luchian, but it was all scattered away after the establishment of the communist regime (the books were burned after his arrest in 1948). The mansion was later used by the Ceaușescu couple as a hunting lodge.

== See also ==
- Foreign relations of Romania
