= Purcăreni =

Purcăreni may refer to several villages in Romania:

- Purcăreni, a village in Micești Commune, Argeș County
- Purcăreni, a village in Popeşti Commune, Argeș County
- Purcăreni, a village in Tărlungeni Commune, Braşov County
