= Hotaru =

Hotaru may refer to:

== Places ==
- Hotaru, in Grojdibodu Commune, Olt County, Romania
- Hotaru, in Andreiașu de Jos Commune, Vrancea County, Romania

== People ==
Hotaru
- Gender: Unisex
- Language: Japanese

Origin
- Meaning: Firefly

Other names
- Alternative spelling: Hiragana: ほたる; Katakana: ホタル; Kanji: 蛍

- Hotaru Akane (1983–2016), Japanese actress
- Hotaru Hazuki (born 1970), Japanese actress and gravure model
- Hotaru Okamoto, manga artist of Only Yesterday
- Hotaru Yamaguchi (born 1990), football player
- Hotaru Yukijiro, actor, starred in Sexy Battle Girls, GARO

== Fictional Characters ==
- Hotaru Shidare (枝垂 ほたる, Shidare Hotaru), a character in the manga series Dagashi Kashi
- Hotaru (.hack), a wavemaster character in the .hack//Legend of the Twilight Bracelet anime
- Hotaru (Mortal Kombat), a male character in the Mortal Kombat fighting games
- Hotaru, a character in the manga series Shugo Chara!
- Hotaru, a character in the manga series Samurai Deeper Kyo
- Hotaru, known in English as Marie, one of the two Squid Sisters in the Splatoon series
- Hotaru Futaba, a character in SNK Playmore fighting games
- Hotaru Himegi, a character in the visual novel If My Heart Had Wings
- Hotaru Hoshikawa (星川 ほたる), a character in the manga series New Game!
- Hotaru Ichijo, a character in the manga series Non Non Biyori
- Hotaru Imai, a character in the anime series Alice Academy
- Hotaru Tachibana (立花 蛍), a character in the manga series Aoharu x Machinegun
- Hotaru Tomoe, lookalike reincarnation of Sailor Saturn in the manga of Sailor Moon

== See also ==
- Hotaru River (disambiguation)
- Hotaru no Haka, or Grave of the Fireflies, a 1988 Studio Ghibli anime film
- Hotar
