= Brătila River =

Brătila River may refer to:

- Brătila, a tributary of the Zârna in Argeș County
- Brătila, a tributary of the Tazlău in Bacău County

== See also ==
- Bratu River
