= Mărăcineni =

Mărăcineni is the name of several places in Romania:

- Mărăcineni, Argeș
- Mărăcineni, Buzău
