= Valea Grecului River =

Valea Grecului River may refer to:

- Valea Grecului, a tributary of the Dâmbovița in Argeș County, Romania
- Valea Grecului, a tributary of the Jidoștița in Mehedinți County, Romania
- Valea Grecului, a tributary of the Prahova in Prahova County, Romania
