= Izvoru Rău River =

Izvoru Rău River may refer to:

- Izvoru Rău River (Bistrița)
- Izvoru Rău, a tributary of the Bârzava in Caraș-Severin County

== See also ==
- Izvoru Mare River (disambiguation)
