= Budeasa (river) =

- Location within Romania

Location
- Country: Romania
- Counties: Argeș County
- Villages: Brânzari, Budeasa Mică, Mărăcineni

Physical characteristics
- Mouth: Râul Doamnei
  - location: Mărăcineni
  - coordinates: 44.8790°N 24.8945°E
- Length: 22 km (14 mi)
- Basin size: 27 km^{2} (10 sq mi)

Basin features
- Progression: Râul Doamnei→ Argeș→ Danube→ Black Sea

The Budeasa is a right tributary of the Râul Doamnei in Romania. It flows into the Râul Doamnei in Mărăcineni. Its length is 22 km (14 mi) and its basin size is 27 km^{2} (10 sq mi).
