= Nyírmező =

Nyírmező is the Hungarian name for two villages in Romania:

- Poiana Aiudului village, Livezile Commune, Alba County
- Mermezeu-Văleni village, Geoagiu Town, Hunedoara County
