= Groapele =

Groapele may refer to:

- Groapele, a tributary of the river Sebeș in Brașov County
- Groapele, a tributary of the river Văsălat in Argeș County

== See also ==
- Groapa (disambiguation)
