= Micești =

- Commune
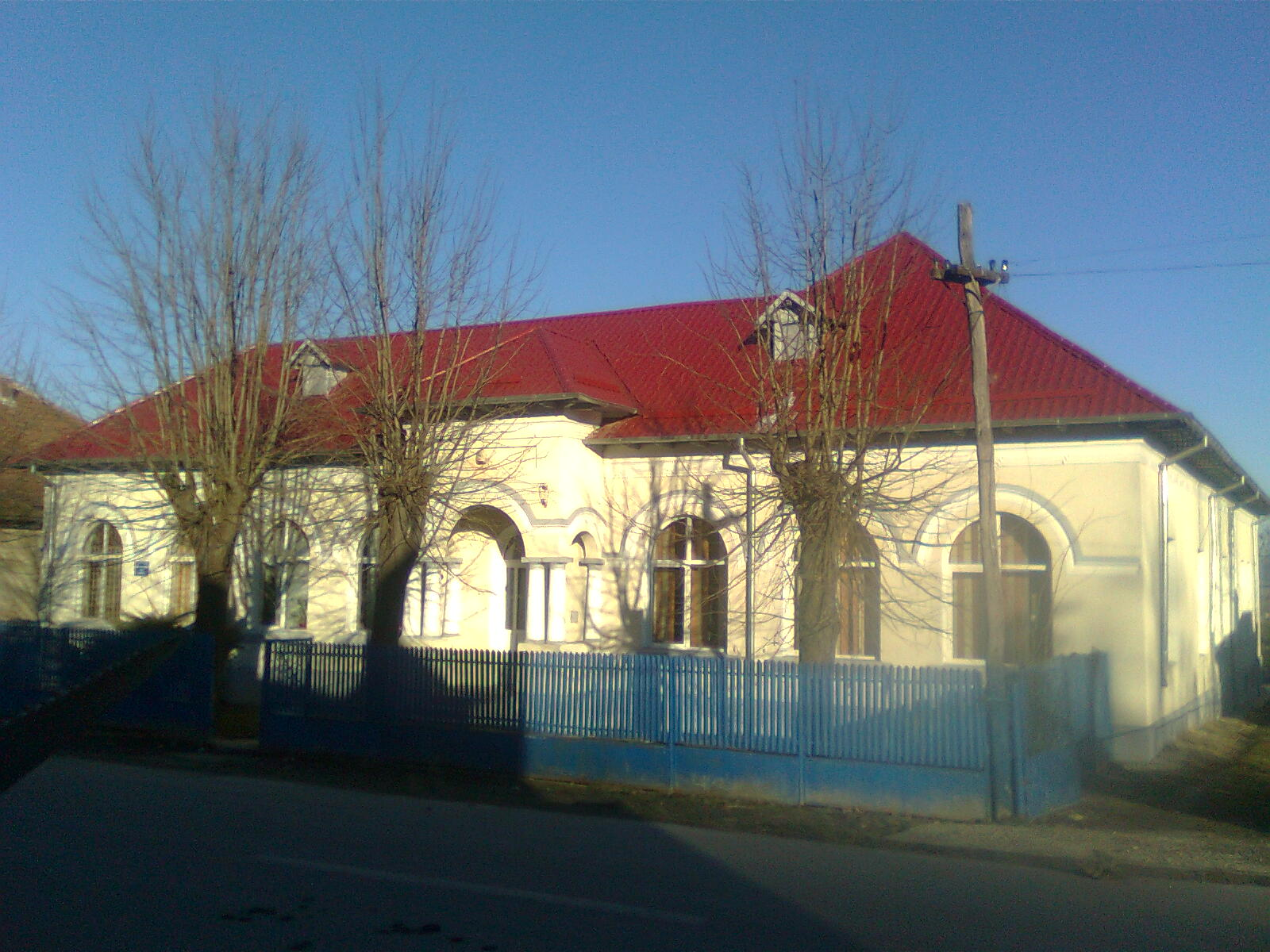
- Building in Purcăreni

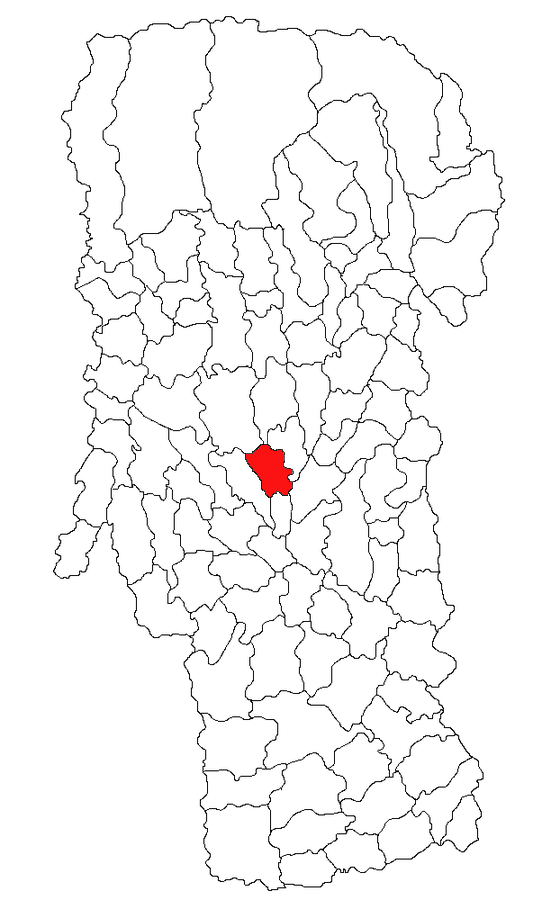
- Location in Argeș County

- Location in Romania
- Coordinates: 44°57′N 24°52′E
- Country: Romania
- County: Argeș

Government
  - Mayor (2024–2028): Nicolae Olteanu (PSD)
- Area: 44 km^{2} (17 sq mi)
- Elevation: 397 m (1,302 ft)
- Lowest elevation: 311 m (1,020 ft)
- Population (2021-12-01): 4,610
  - Density: 100/km^{2} (270/sq mi)
- Time zone: UTC+02:00 (EET)
  - Summer (DST): UTC+03:00 (EEST)
- Postal code: 117465
- Area code: (+40) 02 48
- Vehicle reg.: AG
- Website: comunamicesti.ro

Micești is a commune in Argeș County, Muntenia, Romania. It is composed of four villages: Brânzari, Micești, Păuleasca, and Purcăreni.

The commune is situated at a mean altitude of 397 metres (1,302 feet), in the southern section of the Getic Plateau, an area of foothills leading up to the Făgăraș Mountains in the Southern Carpathians. It lies on the banks of Râul Doamnei, where the river receives its tributary, the Micești River; another tributary, the river Budeasa, flows through Brânzari village.

Micești is located in the central part of Argeș County, 12 km (7.5 mi) north of the county seat, Pitești. It has the following neighbors Mălureni and Coșești communes to the north, Dârmănești commune to the northeast, the town of Mioveni to the east, Mărăcineni commune to the south, and Budeasa commune to the west.

Purcăreni village is crossed by the national road DN73, which connects Pitești to the city of Brașov, in Transylvania. Micești village is traversed by county road DJ740, which leads south to Mărăcineni (where it also ends in DN73), and north to Păuleasca village, from where it continues to Mălureni.

== Natives ==
- Emanoil Bârzotescu (1888–1968), major general during World War II.
