= Cuza Vodă, Galați =

Coordinates: 45.597°N 27.791°E

Cuza Vodă
- Commune
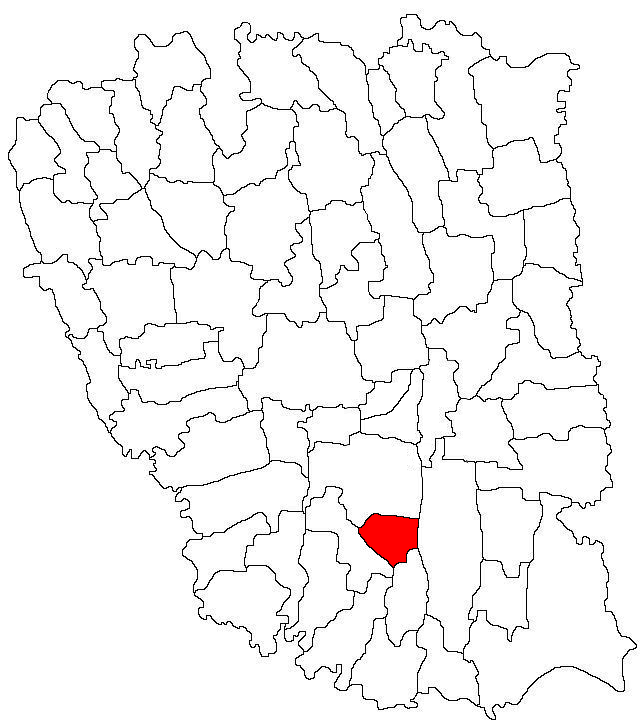
- Location in Galați County

- Location in Romania
- Coordinates
- Country: Romania
- County: Galați

Government
  - Mayor (2020–2024): Dănuț Codrescu (PNL)
- Area: 27.49 km^{2} (10.61 sq mi)
- Elevation: 33 m (108 ft)
- Population (2021-12-01): 2,281
  - Density: 83/km^{2} (210/sq mi)
- Time zone: EET/EEST (UTC+2/+3)
- Postal code: 807271
- Vehicle reg.: GL
- Website: cuzavoda-galati.ro

Cuza Vodă is a commune in Galați County, Western Moldavia, Romania with a population of 2,580 people. It is composed of a single village, Cuza Vodă. This was part of Slobozia Conachi Commune until 2005, when it was split off to form a separate commune.
