= Valea Păcurarului =

- Location within Romania

Location
- Country: Romania
- Counties: Argeș County
- Villages: Coșești

Physical characteristics
- Mouth: Râul Doamnei
  - location: Jupânești
  - coordinates: 45.0672°N 24.8553°E
- Length: 11 km (6.8 mi)
- Basin size: 17 km^{2} (6.6 sq mi)

Basin features
- Progression: Râul Doamnei→ Argeș→ Danube→ Black Sea

The Valea Păcurarului is a left tributary of the Râul Doamnei in Romania. It flows into the Râul Doamnei in Jupânești. Its length is 11 km (6.8 mi) and its basin size is 17 km^{2} (6.6 sq mi).
