= Izvori =

Izvori (Serbian and Montenegrin for "Springs") may refer to:

- Izvori (Zvečan), a village in the Zvečan Municipality
- Izvori (Cetinje), a village in the Cetinje Municipality

== See also ==
- Izvor (disambiguation)
