= Miculești =

Miculești may refer to several villages in Romania:

- Miculești, a village in the town of Pucioasa, Dâmbovița County
- Miculești, a village in Slivilești Commune, Gorj County

== See also ==
- Micești (disambiguation)
