= Livezile, Alba =

Livezile
- Commune
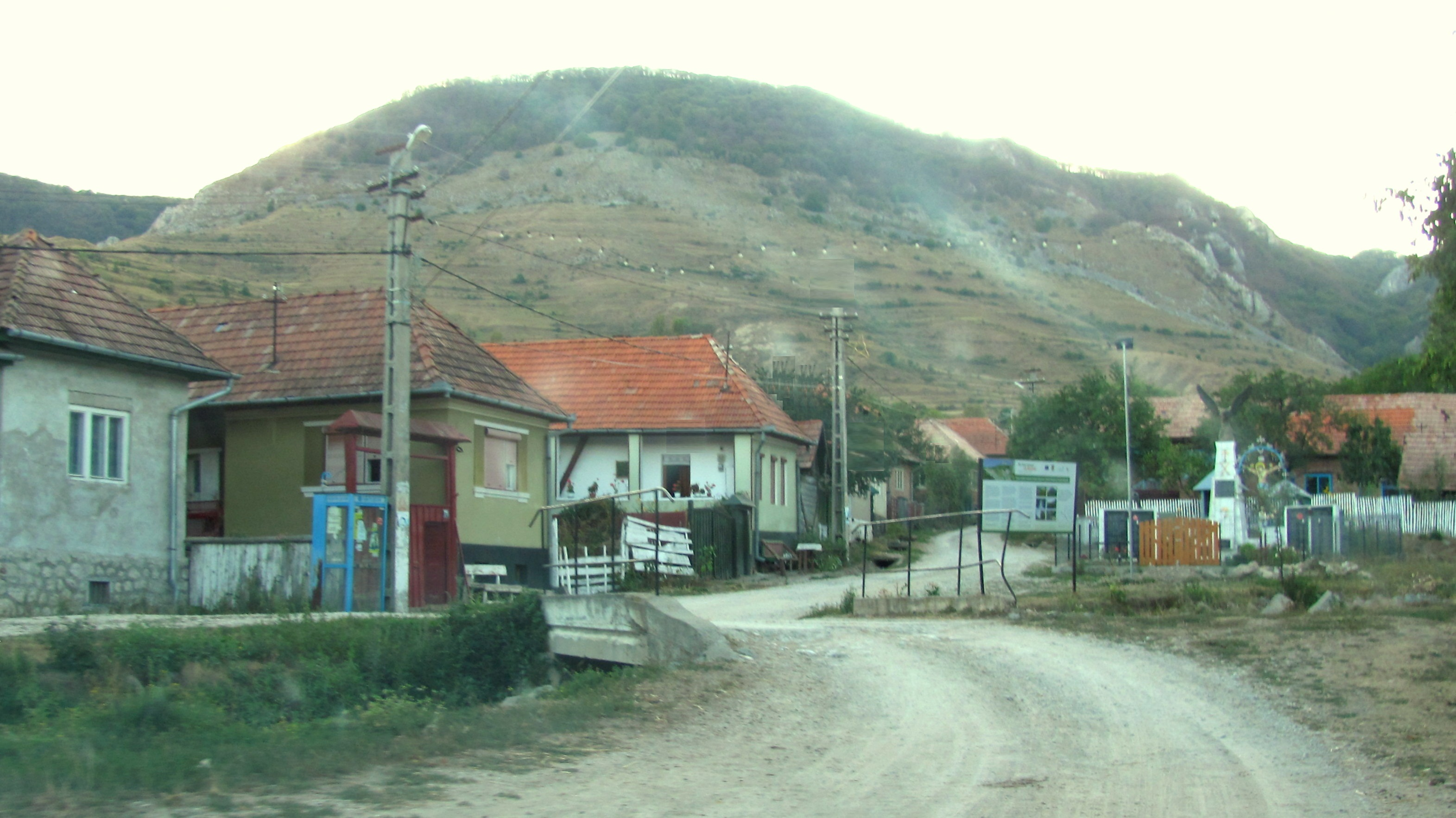
- View of Livezile

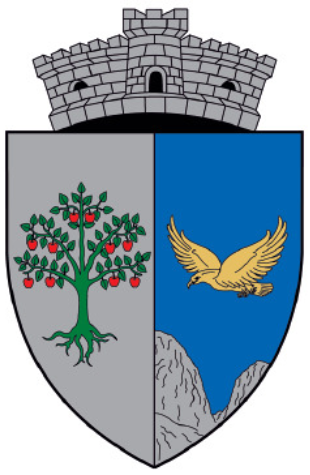
- Coat of arms

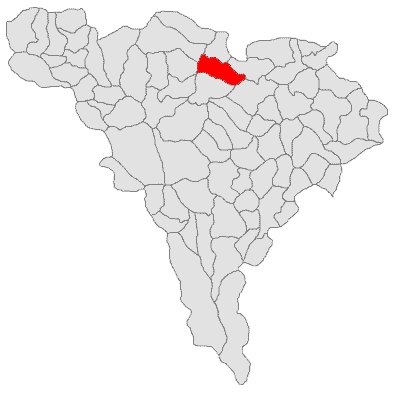
- Location in Alba County

- Location in Romania
- Coordinates: 46°21′N 23°28′E
- Country: Romania
- County: Alba

Government
  - Mayor (2020–2024): Horațiu-Nicolae Han (PNL)
- Area: 65.86 km^{2} (25.43 sq mi)
- Elevation: 329 m (1,079 ft)
- Population (2021-12-01): 1,041
  - Density: 15.81/km^{2} (40.94/sq mi)
- Time zone: UTC+02:00 (EET)
  - Summer (DST): UTC+03:00 (EEST)
- Postal code: 517390
- Area code: (+40) 02 58
- Vehicle reg.: AB
- Website: primarialivezile.ro

Livezile (until 1960 Cacova; German: Laßlenkirch, Hungarian: Úrháza) is a commune located in Alba County, Transylvania, Romania. It is composed of four villages: Izvoarele (Bedellő), Livezile, Poiana Aiudului (Nyírmező), and Vălișoara (Torockógyertyános).

The commune is situated in the northern foothills of the Trascău Mountains, in the Apuseni mountain range. It lies on the banks of the Aiud River; its tributaries, the rivers Inzel and Rachiș, flow through Poiana Aiudului.

Located in the northern part of the county, Livezile is at a distance of 7 km (4.3 mi) from the city of Aiud, and 38 km (24 mi) from the county seat, Alba Iulia. It is crossed by county road DJ107M, which connects Aiud to Iara, in Cluj County.

The road passes through the nearby Vălișoarei Gorge (Cheile Vălișoarei, or Cheile Aiudului), which belong to the administrative territory of the commune. The gorges are 1,000 metres (3,300 feet) long, 25–150 m (82–492 ft) wide, and 100–150 m (330–490 ft) high. The walls of the gorges house 27 small caves with shallow karst shapes: lapis lazuli, vaults, and arches, the largest one being 134 m (440 ft). The caves are home to rare species of invertebrates and bats.

Historical population
Year	Pop.	±%
1850	2,325	—
1941	3,573	+53.7%
2002	1,526	−57.3%
2011	1,192	−21.9%
2021	1,041	−12.7%
Source: INS, Census data
