= Birchiș =

- Commune
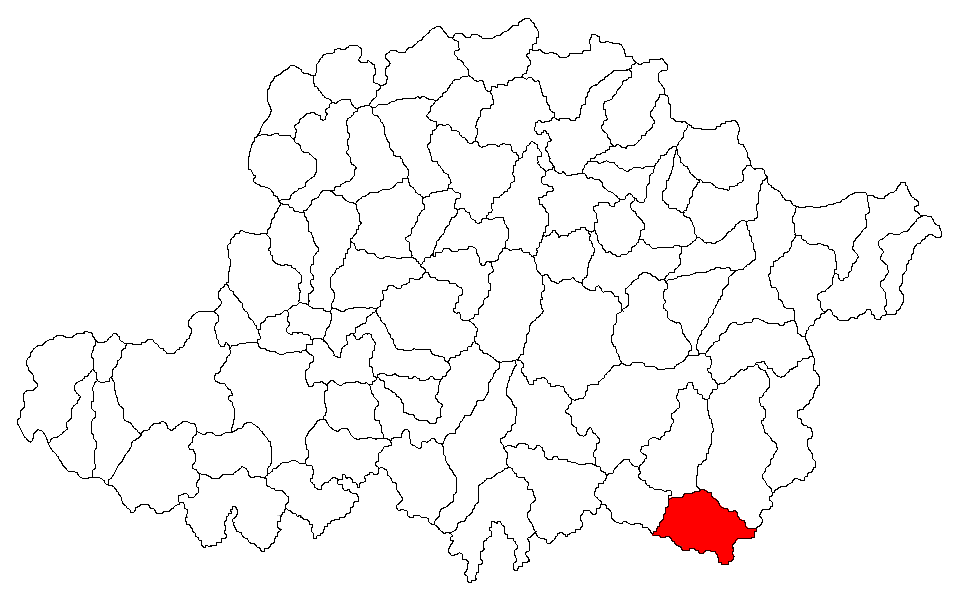
- Location in Arad County

- Location in Romania
- Coordinates: 45°57′53″N 22°10′06″E
- Country: Romania
- County: Arad
- Population (2021-12-01): 1,707
- Time zone: EET/EEST (UTC+2/+3)
- Vehicle reg.: AR

Birchiș (Hungarian: Marosberkes; German: Birkisch) is a commune in Arad County, Romania.

The commune is situated in the contact zone of the Mureș Couloir with the Lipova Hills and it stretches over a surface of 10228 ha. It is composed of four villages: Birchiș (situated at 81 km from Arad), Căpâlnaș (Kápolnás), Ostrov (Marossziget) and Virișmort (Szádvörösmart).

== Population ==
According to the last census the population of the commune counts 2044 inhabitants. From an ethnical point of view it has the following structure: 87.7% are Romanians, 0.5% Hungarians, 11.6 Roma and 0.2% are of other or undeclared nationalities.

== History ==
The first documentary record of the locality Birchiș dates back to 1596. Căpâlnaș was first mentioned in 1369, Ostrov in 1169 and Virișmort in 1374.

== Economy ==
The economy of the commune is mainly agricultural, plant-growing and livestock-breeding are well represented.

== Tourism ==
There is a castle in Căpâlnaș, a historical and architectural monument built in the 19th century (today being a sanatorium). The commune Birchiș is well known both in the country and abroad for the ceramic products made by local craftsmen.
