= Rachiș =

River in Romania

- Location within Romania

Location
- Country: Romania
- Counties: Alba County
- Villages: Rachiș

Physical characteristics
- Mouth: Aiud
  - location: Poiana Aiudului
  - coordinates: 46.3668°N 23.6033°E
- Length: 15 km (9.3 mi)
- Basin size: 33 km^{2} (13 sq mi)

Basin features
- Progression: Aiud→ Mureș→ Tisza→ Danube→ Black Sea

The Rachiș is a left tributary of the river Aiud in Romania. It flows into the Aiud in Poiana Aiudului. Its length is 15 km (9.3 mi) and its basin size is 33 km^{2} (13 sq mi).
