= Cernat (Râul Doamnei) =

Cernat Preotesele
- Location within Romania

Location
- Country: Romania
- Counties: Argeș County

Physical characteristics
- Mouth: Râul Doamnei
  - coordinates: 45.3899°N 24.7997°E
- Length: 18 km (11 mi)
- Basin size: 63 km^{2} (24 sq mi)

Basin features
- Progression: Râul Doamnei→ Argeș→ Danube→ Black Sea
- Tributaries
  - left: Plăișoru
  - right: Valea Maliței, Gruișoru, Basa

The Cernat is a right tributary of the Râul Doamnei in Romania. The upper reach of the river is also known as Preotesele. It flows into the Râul Doamnei north of the village Slatina. Its length is 18 km (11 mi) and its basin size is 63 km^{2} (24 sq mi).
