= Izvorul Negru =

Izvorul Negru may refer to the following rivers in Romania:

- Izvorul Negru, a tributary of the Asău in Bacău County
- Izvorul Negru, a tributary of the Râușor in Maramureș County
- Izvorul Negru (Uz), a tributary of the Uz in Bacău County
- Izvorul Negru, a tributary of the Vișeu in Maramureș County

== See also ==
- Izvorul (disambiguation)
- Negrea (disambiguation)
- Negrișoara (disambiguation)
