= Izvoarele =

Izvoarele may refer to several places in Romania:

Populated places:

- Izvoarele, Giurgiu and Isvoarele, communes in Giurgiu County
- Izvoarele, Olt, a commune in Olt County
- Izvoarele, Prahova, a commune in Prahova County
- Izvoarele, Tulcea, a commune in Tulcea County
- Izvoarele, Teleorman, a commune in Teleorman County
- Izvoarele, a village in Blaj Town, Alba County
- Izvoarele, a village in Gârda de Sus Commune, Alba County
- Izvoarele, a village in Livezile, Alba
- Izvoarele, a village in Viişoara, Bihor
- Izvoarele, a village in Bozioru Commune, Buzău County
- Izvoarele, a village in Lipnița Commune, Constanţa County
- Izvoarele, a village in Voinești, Dâmbovița
- Izvoarele, a village in Slobozia Conachi Commune, Galaţi County
- Izvoarele, a village in Plopșoru Commune, Gorj County
- Izvoarele, a village in Teliucu Inferior Commune, Hunedoara County
- Izvoarele, a village in Răchiteni Commune, Iași County
- Izvoarele, a village in Cernești Commune, Maramureș County
- Izvoarele, a village in Gruia Commune, Mehedinți County
- Izvoarele, a village in Corbița Commune, Vrancea County
- Izvoarele, a village in Zetea Commune, Harghita County

Rivers:

- Izvoarele (Vedea), a tributary of the Vedea in Teleorman County
- Izvoarele, a tributary of the Aiud (Mureș basin) in Alba County
- Izvoarele, a tributary of the Podriga (Prut basin) in Botoșani County
- Izvoarele, a tributary of the Olănești (Olt basin) in Vâlcea County
