= Florentin Nicolae =

Romanian alpine skier (born 1981)

Personal information
- Nationality: Romanian
- Born: 23 February 1981 (age 44); Ștefănești, Argeș, Romania

Sport
- Sport: Alpine skiing

Florentin Nicolae (born 23 February 1981) is a Romanian alpine skier. He competed in two events at the 2006 Winter Olympics.
