= Slobozia Conachi =

- Commune
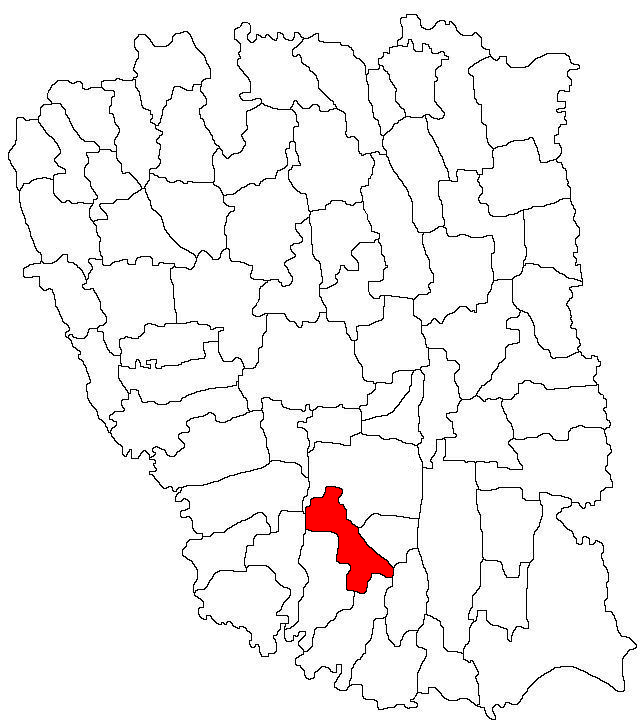
- Location in Galați County

- Location in Romania
- Coordinates: 45.585°N 27.770°E
- Country: Romania
- County: Galați
- Population (2021-12-01): 3,696
- Time zone: EET/EEST (UTC+2/+3)
- Vehicle reg.: GL

Slobozia Conachi is a commune in Galați County, Western Moldavia, Romania with a population of 7,178 people. It is composed of two villages, Izvoarele and Slobozia Conachi. It also included the village of Cuza Vodă until 2005, when it was split off to form a separate commune.
