= Corbi =

- Commune
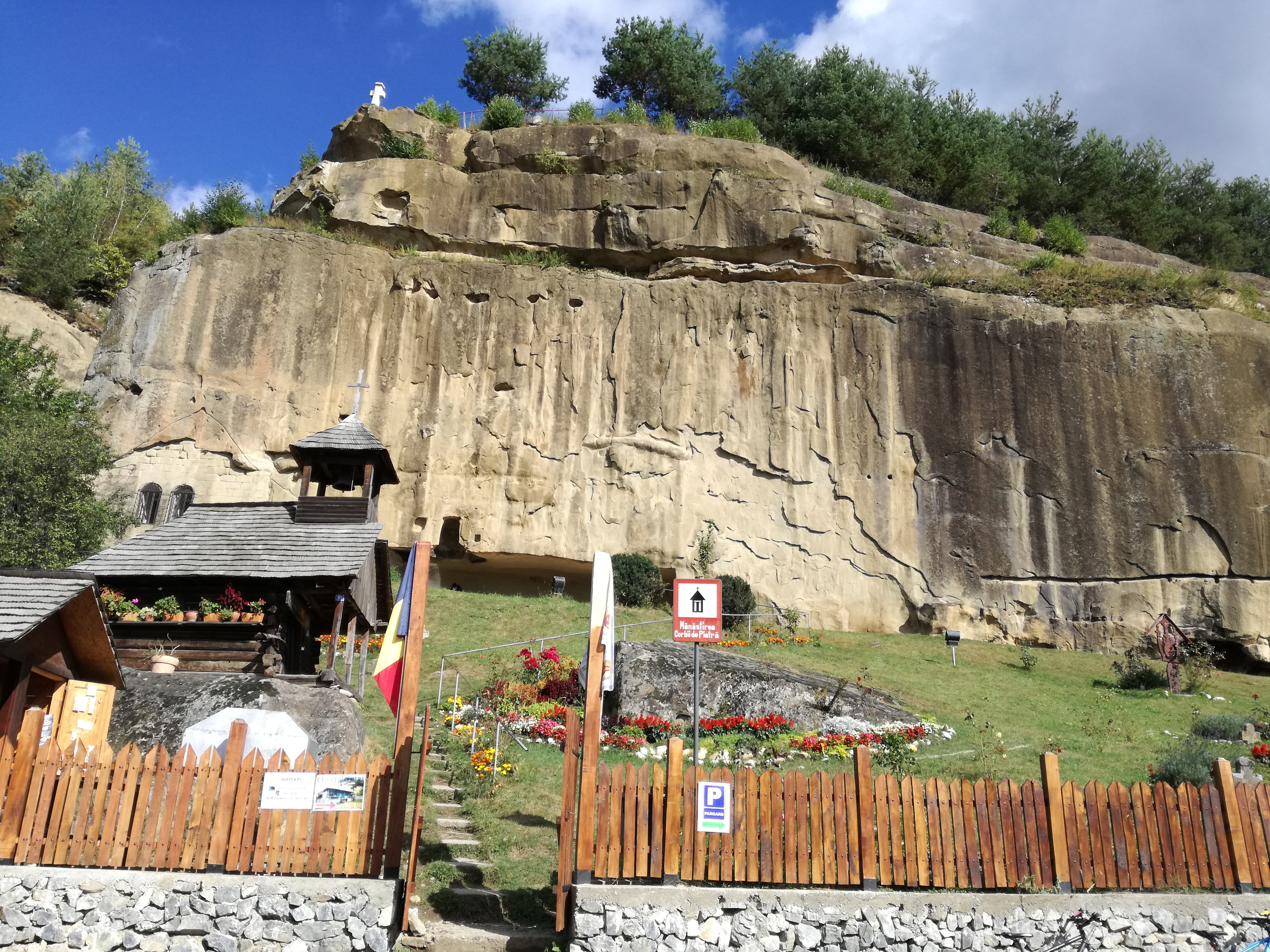
- The Corbii de Piatră monastery and wooden church in Jgheaburi

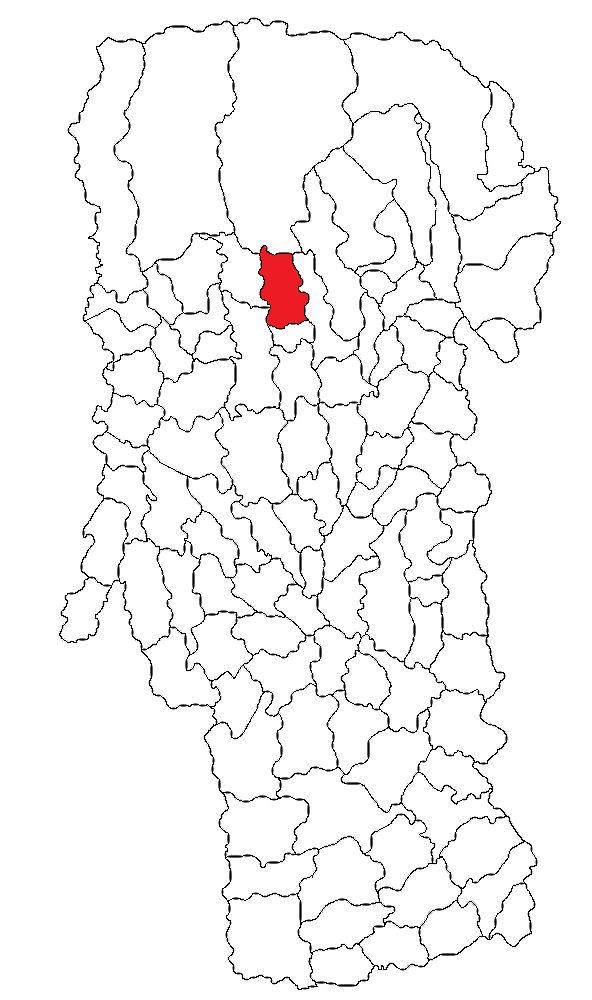
- Location in Argeș County

- Location in Romania
- Coordinates: 45°17′16″N 24°48′9″E
- Country: Romania
- County: Argeș

Government
  - Mayor (2024–2028): Constantin Mogaru (PSD)
- Area: 56.52 km^{2} (21.82 sq mi)
- Elevation: 540 m (1,770 ft)
- Population (2021-12-01): 3,420
  - Density: 60.5/km^{2} (157/sq mi)
- Time zone: UTC+02:00 (EET)
  - Summer (DST): UTC+03:00 (EEST)
- Postal code: 117285
- Area code: (+40) 0248
- Vehicle reg.: AG
- Website: primariacorbi.ro

Corbi is a commune in Argeș County, Muntenia, Romania. It is composed of six villages: Corbi, Corbșori, Jgheaburi, Poduri, Poenărei, and Stănești.

Corbi is located in the northern part of Argeș County: its neighbours are Nucșoara commune to the north, Domnești commune to the south, Aninoasa commune to the east, and Brăduleț and Mușătești communes to the west.

The commune covers an area of 5,652 ha (13,970 acres). The agricultural surface of the entire locality is 5,664 hectares, of which 198 ha is arable land, 2,829 ha pastures, 1,809 ha hay fields, 828 ha meadows, and 200 ha forests.The sum of those surfaces is 5,864 ha, which is greater than the agricultural surface (5,664 ha), which in turn is greater than the total surface (5,652 ha).

As of the 2021 census, Corbu had a population of 3,420 people. At the 2011 census, the commune had 3,784 inhabitants, of which 97.82% were Romanians. The main occupations are sheep-keeping (20,000 sheep), cattle-keeping (1,700 heads of cattle), and animal husbandry.

The commune's villages have six schools, six Romanian Orthodox churches, five kindergartens, three community centres, a medical unit, a veterinary office, a pharmacy, a post office, a bakery and other businesses.

== Natives ==
- Voyk Hunyadi (14th century–c. 1419), father of John Hunyadi (Governor of Hungary, 1446–1452) and grandfather of Matthias Corvinus (King of Hungary, 1458–1490)
- John Hunyadi (c. 1406–1456), father of Matthias Corvinus
- Teofan Savu (born 1959), Metropolitan of Moldavia and Bukovina.
