= Valea Mare (Râul Doamnei) =

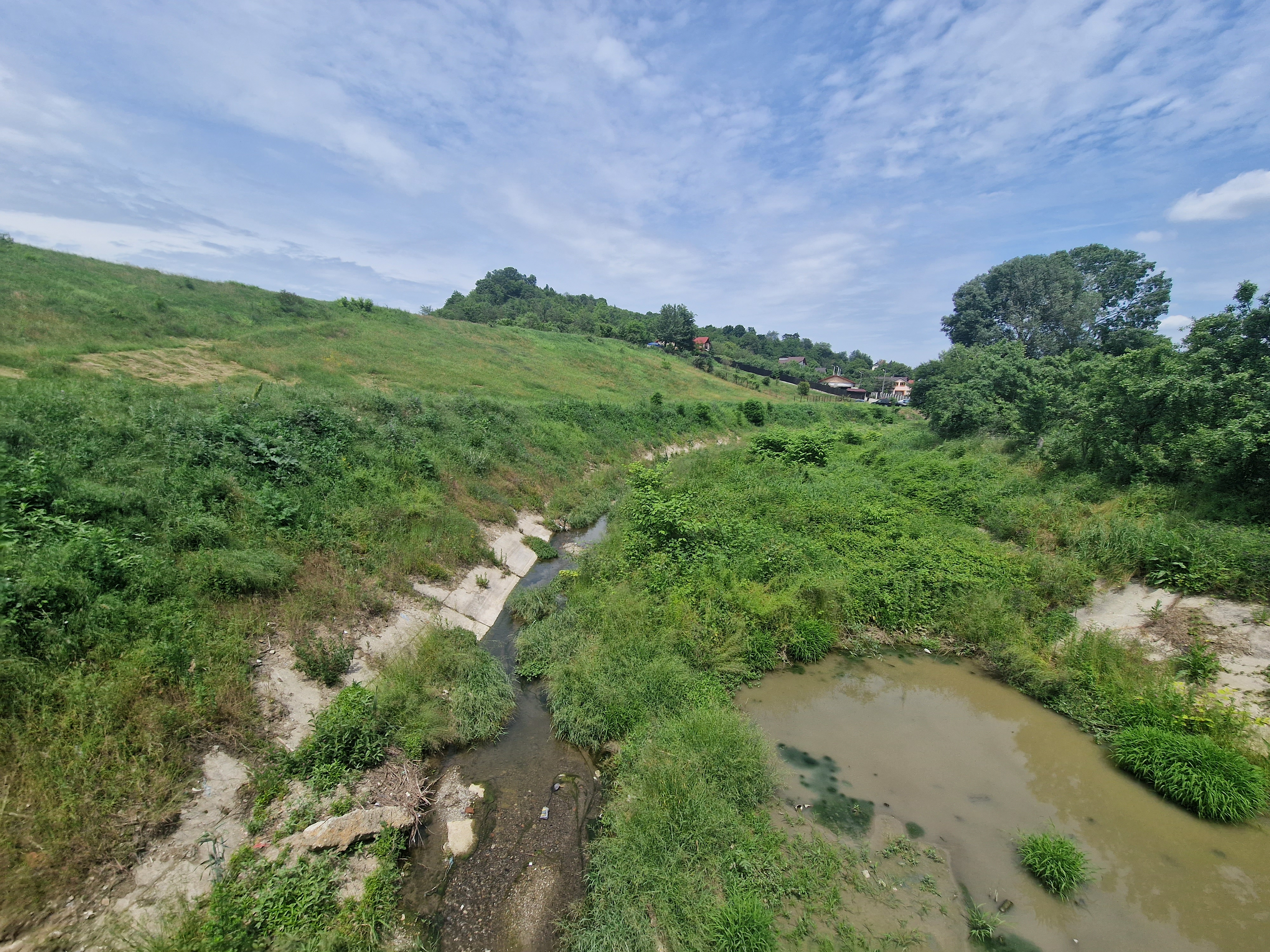

- Location within Romania

Location
- Country: Romania
- Counties: Argeș County
- Villages: Enculești, Valea Mare-Podgoria

Physical characteristics
- Mouth: Râul Doamnei
  - location: Valea Mare-Podgoria
  - coordinates: 44.8789°N 24.8956°E
- Length: 13 km (8.1 mi)
- Basin size: 30 km^{2} (12 sq mi)

Basin features
- Progression: Râul Doamnei→ Argeș→ Danube→ Black Sea

The Valea Mare is a left tributary of the Râul Doamnei in Romania. It flows into the Râul Doamnei in Valea Mare-Podgoria. Its length is 13 km (8.1 mi) and its basin size is 30 km^{2} (12 sq mi).
