= Groapa (disambiguation) =

Groapa may refer to the following places in Romania:

Rivers:

- Groapa, a tributary of the Barcău in Sălaj County
- Groapa, a tributary of the Pleșcoaia in Gorj County
- Groapa Apei, a tributary of the Modicea in Harghita County
- Groapa Copaciului, a tributary of the Timiș in Caraș-Severin County
- Groapa Gomboșoaiei, a tributary of the Lonea in Cluj County
- Groapa Seacă, a tributary of the Jieț in Hunedoara County
- Groapa Pârâului, a tributary of the Ozunca in Covasna County
- Groapa Pietroasă, a tributary of the Aita in Covasna County
- Groapa Pietroasă, a tributary of the Mărcușa in Covasna County

Populated places:

- Groapa Rădăii, a village in the commune Miheșu de Câmpie, Mureș County
- Groapa Tufei, a village in the commune Gura Caliței, Vrancea County
- Groapa Vlădichii, a village in the commune Moara, Suceava County

== See also ==
- Groapele (disambiguation)
- Izvorul Gropii (disambiguation)
