= Emanoil Bârzotescu =

Romanian major general (1888-1968)

Major-General Emanoil Bârzotescu
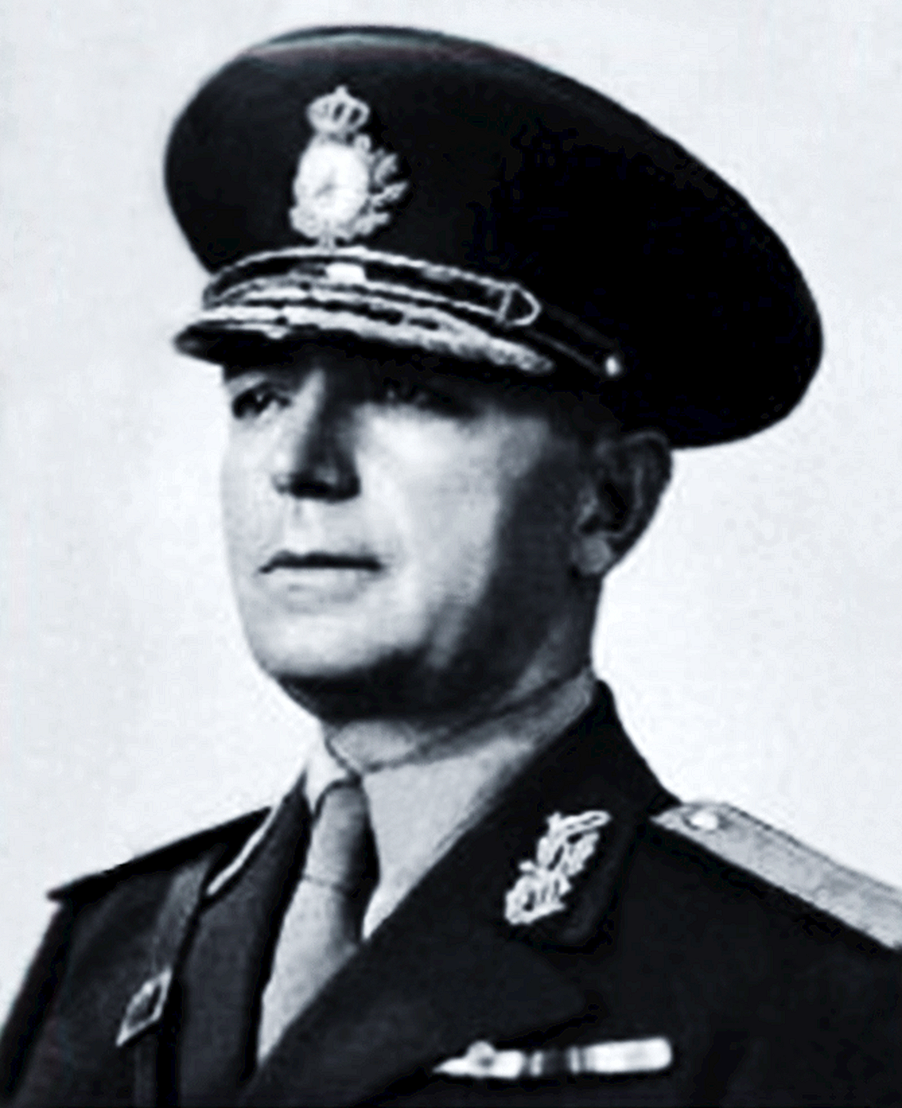
- General Emanoil Bârzotescu
- Born: 20 October 1888; Micești, Muscel County, Kingdom of Romania
- Died: 3 July 1968 (aged 79); Pitești, Romania
- Military career
- Allegiance: Kingdom of Romania
- Branch: Army
- Conflicts: Second Balkan War; World War I World War II
- Awards: Order of the Crown, Commander rank

Emanoil Bârzotescu (20 October 1888 – 3 July 1968) was a Romanian major general during World War II.

Bârzotescu was born in Micești village, in what was then Muscel County (now Argeș County), in southern central Romania. As a young officer he served in the Second Balkan War (1913) and in World War I (1916–1918).

He served as General Officer Commanding of the 1st Division from 1 January 1940 to 1942, retiring thereafter. In February 1945 he was first recalled, then put into reserve, and finally served as General Officer Commanding the 6th Corps Area. He was put in reserve again on August 21, 1946, and re-retired on August 9, 1947.

Bârzotescu was arrested in April 1946 in Sibiu and was investigated by the Ministry of Interior authorities in the fall of 1947, in the trial of Iuliu Maniu. He was arrested on June 14, 1950, and sent to forced labor camps (Saligny, Peninsula, Midia) along the Danube–Black Sea Canal. He was freed on October 27, 1953 from the Castelu labor camp.

A street is named after him in Pitești, the city where he died in 1968.
