= Izvor (Bosilegrad) =

Izvor Извор
- Village (Selo)
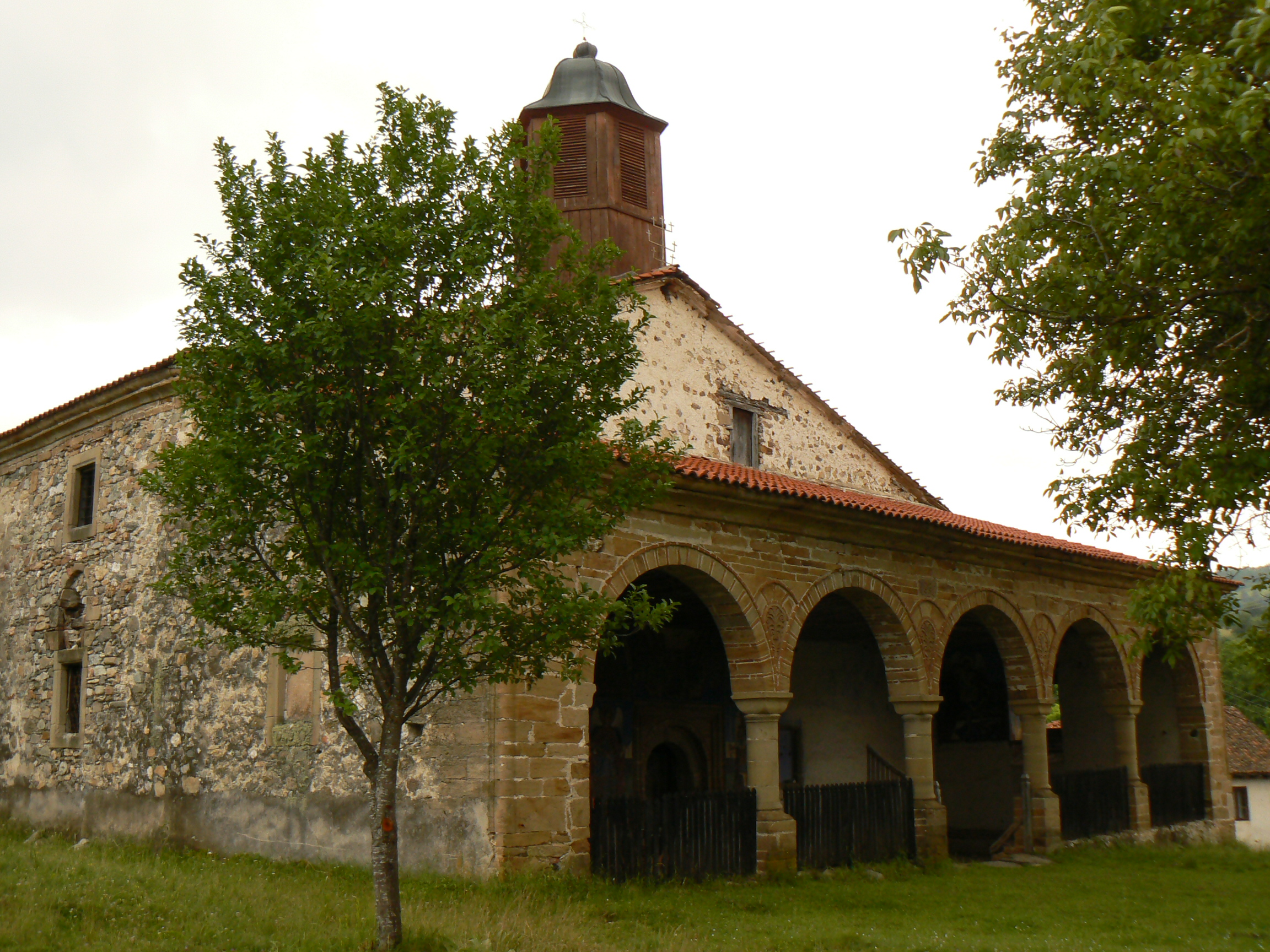

- Location within Serbia
- Coordinates: 42°30′N 22°30′E
- Country: Serbia
- Region: Southern and Eastern Serbia
- District: Pčinja
- Municipality: Bosilegrad

Population (2002)
  - Total: 115
- Time zone: UTC+1 (CET)
  - Summer (DST): UTC+2 (CEST)

Izvor (Serbian Cyrillic: Извор) is a village in the municipality of Bosilegrad, Serbia. According to the 2002 census, the town has a population of 115 people.
