= Izvoare =

Izvoare may refer to the following places:

Moldova

- Izvoare, Fălești, a commune
- Izvoare, Florești, a commune
- Izvoare, a village in Pohrebeni Commune, Orhei District
- Izvoare, Sîngerei, a commune

Romania

- Izvoare, a village in Bahna commune, Neamț County
- Izvoare, Dolj, a commune
- Izvoare, a village in Dumbrava Roșie commune, Neamț County
- Izvoare, a village in Suharău commune, Botoșani County
- Izvoare, a village in Zetea commune, Harghita County
- Izvoare, a tributary of the Neamț in Neamț County
- Izvoare, another name for the river Pârâul Băutor, Harghita County
