= Izvor (Pirot) =

Izvor Извор
- Village
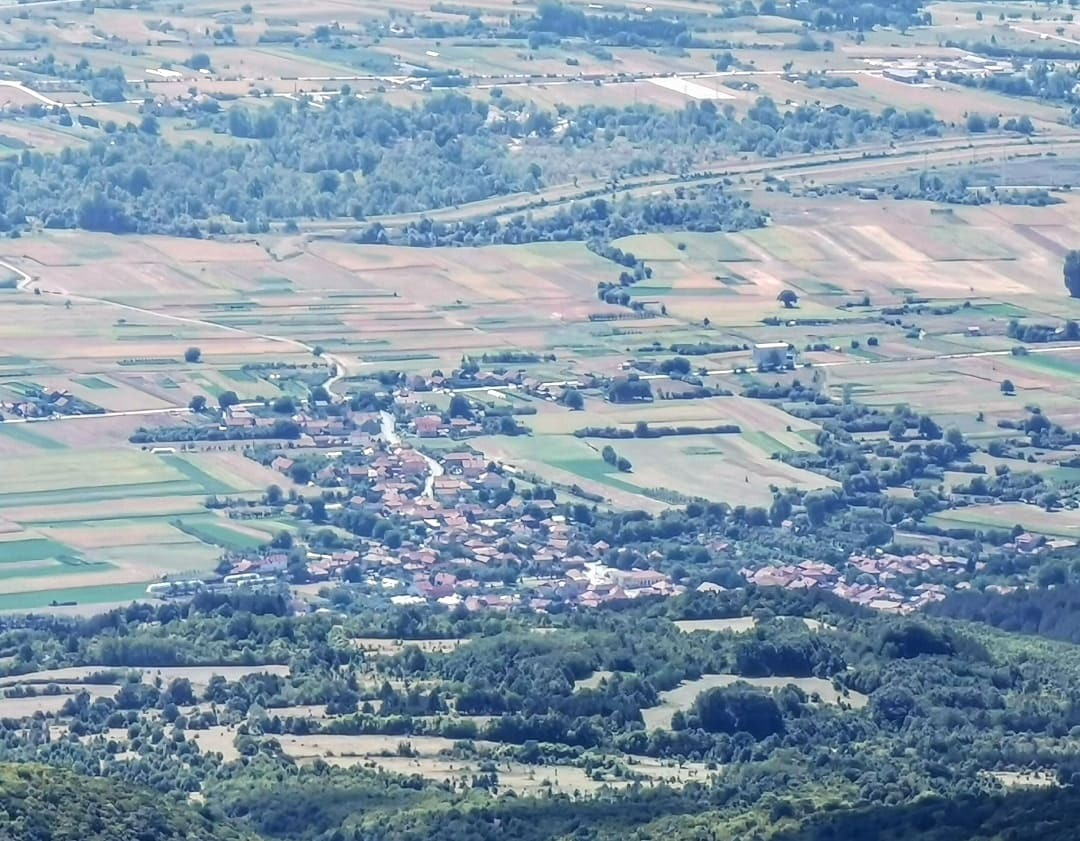

- Location within Serbia
- Coordinates: 43°08′51″N 22°37′58″E
- Country: Serbia
- Region: Southern and Eastern Serbia
- District: Pirot
- Municipality: Pirot

Population (2002)
  - Total: 781
- Time zone: UTC+1 (CET)
  - Summer (DST): UTC+2 (CEST)

Izvor is a village in the municipality of Pirot, Serbia. According to the 2002 census, the village has a population of 781 people.
