= Hotar River =

Hotar, Hotaru or Hotarul may refer to the following rivers in Romania:

- Hotar River (Sulța), tributary of the Sulța (Trotuș basin) in Bacău County
- Hotaru, tributary of the Crizbav (Olt basin) in Brașov County
- Hotaru, tributary of the Bozom (Olt basin) in Brașov County
- Hotaru River (Slănic), tributary of the Slănic (Buzău basin) in Buzău County
- Hotar, tributary of the Botul (Mureș basin) in Harghita County
- Hotaru, tributary of the Olt near Maieruș, Brașov County
- Hotarul, a tributary of the Olt near Olteț, Brașov County
- Hotarul, tributary of the Cormoș (Olt basin) in Covasna County

== See also ==
- Izvorul cu Hotar River (disambiguation)
