= Inzel =

- Location within Romania

Location
- Country: Romania
- Counties: Alba County

Physical characteristics
- Mouth: Aiud
  - location: Poiana Aiudului
  - coordinates: 46.3657°N 23.6026°E

Basin features
- Progression: Aiud→ Mureș→ Tisza→ Danube→ Black Sea
- Tributaries
  - left: Bedeleu

The Inzel is a right tributary of the river Aiud in Romania. It flows into the Aiud in Poiana Aiudului. Its length is 12 km (7.5 mi) and its basin size is 46 km^{2} (18 sq mi).
