= Aiud =

City in Alba County, Romania

- Municipality
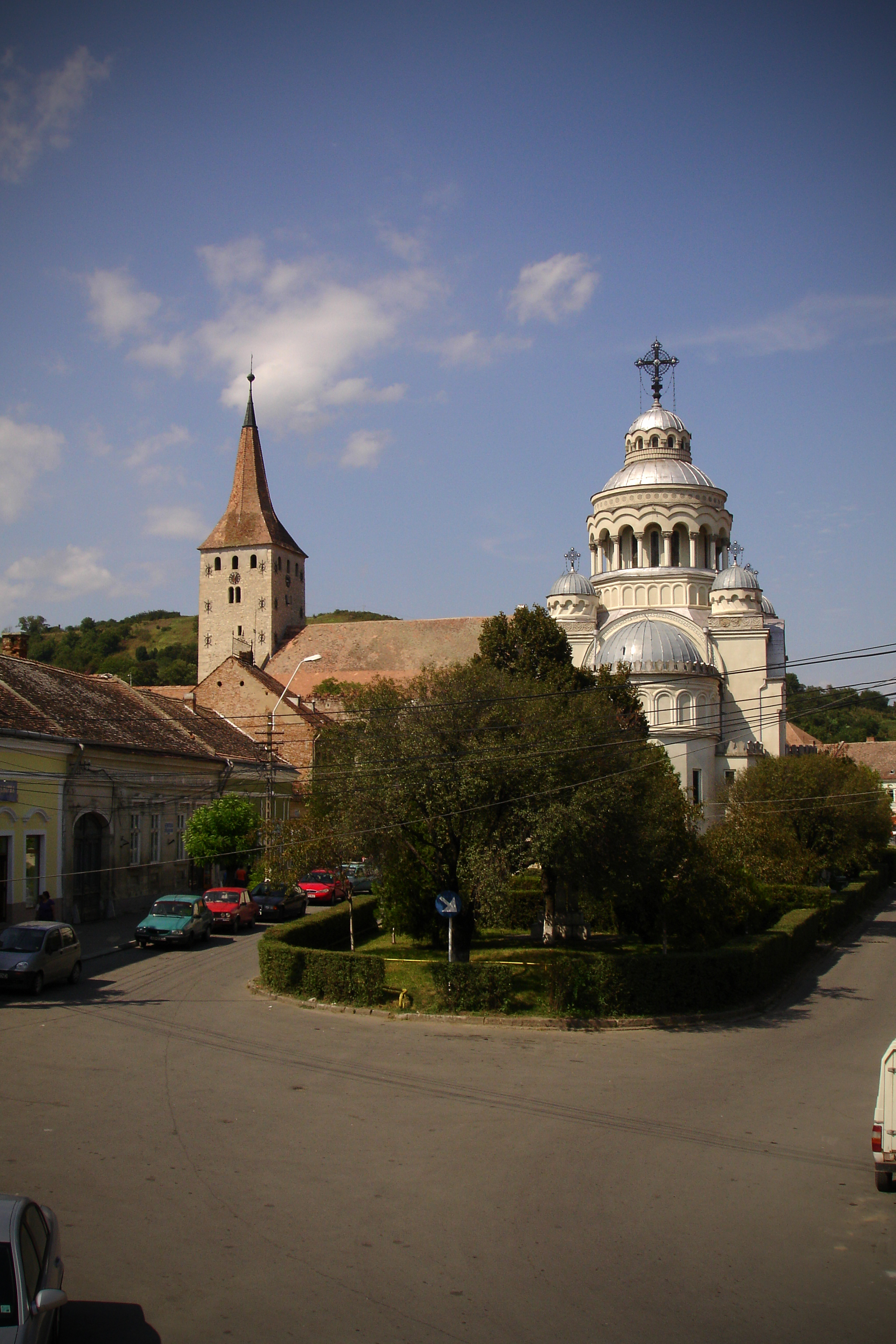

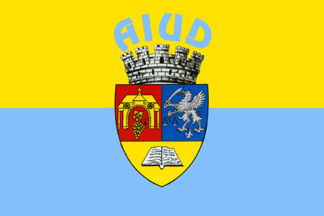
- Flag Coat of arms

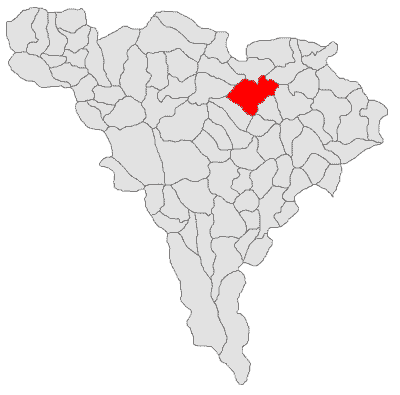
- Location in Alba County

- Location in Romania
- Coordinates: 46°18′44″N 23°43′45″E
- Country: Romania
- County: Alba

Government
  - Mayor (2024–2028): Dragoș-Ionuț Crișan (PSD)
- Area: 142.52 km^{2} (55.03 sq mi)
- Elevation: 258 m (846 ft)
- Population (2021-12-01): 21,307
  - Density: 149.50/km^{2} (387.21/sq mi)
- Time zone: UTC+02:00 (EET)
  - Summer (DST): UTC+03:00 (EEST)
- Postal code: 515200
- Area code: (+40) 02 58
- Vehicle reg.: AB
- Website: www.aiud.ro

Aiud (Romanian pronunciation: [aˈjud]; Latin: Brucla, Hungarian: Nagyenyed, Hungarian pronunciation: [ˈnɒɟɛɲɛd]; German: Straßburg am Mieresch) is a city located in Alba County, Transylvania, Romania. The city's population is 21,307 (2021). It has the status of municipiu. The city derives its name ultimately from Saint Giles (Aegidius), to whom the first church in the settlement was dedicated when built.

== Administration ==
Aiud is made up of the city proper and of ten villages. These are divided into four urban villages and six villages which are located outside the city proper but fall under its administration. The four urban villages are: Aiudul de Sus, Gâmbaș, Măgina, and Păgida. The rural villages are: Ciumbrud (0.81 km^{2} (0.31 sq mi)), Sâncrai (0.65 km^{2} (0.25 sq mi)), Gârbova de Jos (1.04 km^{2} (0.40 sq mi)), Țifra (0.06 km^{2} (0.023 sq mi)), Gârbova de Sus (0.52 km^{2} (0.20 sq mi)) and Gârbovița (0.28 km^{2} (0.11 sq mi)).

== Demographics ==
Historical population
Year	Pop.	±%
1910	8,663	—
1930	9,478	+9.4%
1948	9,535	+0.6%
1956	11,886	+24.7%
1966	16,536	+39.1%
1977	24,620	+48.9%
1992	31,894	+29.5%
2002	28,909	−9.4%
2011	22,876	−20.9%
2016	26,296	+15.0%
2021	21,307	−19.0%
Source: Census data & National Institute of Statistics INSEE

At the 2021 census, Aiud had a population of 21,307. In 2016, the total population was 26,296, of which 12,900 were male and 13,396 female.

=== Localities ===
Aiud comprises the city proper and the ten villages it administers, in order of population:

- Aiud city proper
- Aiudul de Sus (Felenyed)
- Ciumbrud (Csombord)
- Sâncrai (Enyedszentkirály)
- Măgina (Muzsnaháza)
- Gâmbaș (Marosgombás)
- Gârbova de Jos (Alsóorbó)
- Gârbova de Sus (Felsőorbó)
- Păgida (Kisapahida)
- Gârbovița (Középorbó)
- Țifra (Cifrafogadó)

=== Ethnicity ===
At the 2011 census, the ethnic composition of the city was:

- Romanians - 16,955 (79.7% of total population for which data are available)
- Hungarians - 3,364 (15.8%)
- Romani - 930 (4.4%)
- Germans - 15 (0.07%)

=== Religion ===
- Orthodox - 76.3% of the total population
- Reformed - 13.1%
- Greek-Catholic - 4.1%
- Roman Catholic - 2.1%
- Unitarian - 1.1%
- Other - 3.3%

== Geography ==
=== Climate ===
Aiud has a humid continental climate (Dfb in the Köppen climate classification). The city is located in the Aiud River valley and therefore has a mountain-type climate. It has a characteristic Transylvanian continental temperate climate. The average winter temperature is −2.6 °C (27 °F) and the average summer temperature is 19.2 °C (67 °F).

Climate data for Aiud
Month	Jan	Feb	Mar	Apr	May	Jun	Jul	Aug	Sep	Oct	Nov	Dec	Year
Mean daily maximum °C (°F)	2 (36)	4.7 (40.5)	10 (50)	15.8 (60.4)	20.3 (68.5)	23.6 (74.5)	25.5 (77.9)	25.7 (78.3)	20.6 (69.1)	15.1 (59.2)	9.2 (48.6)	3.4 (38.1)	14.7 (58.4)
Daily mean °C (°F)	−1.7 (28.9)	0.3 (32.5)	4.7 (40.5)	10.5 (50.9)	15.3 (59.5)	18.9 (66.0)	20.7 (69.3)	20.8 (69.4)	15.8 (60.4)	10.2 (50.4)	5 (41)	−0.1 (31.8)	10.0 (50.0)
Mean daily minimum °C (°F)	−5.1 (22.8)	−3.6 (25.5)	−0.5 (31.1)	4.7 (40.5)	9.6 (49.3)	13.3 (55.9)	15.2 (59.4)	15.6 (60.1)	11 (52)	5.8 (42.4)	1.4 (34.5)	−3.1 (26.4)	5.4 (41.7)
Average precipitation mm (inches)	33 (1.3)	31 (1.2)	43 (1.7)	60 (2.4)	79 (3.1)	94 (3.7)	88 (3.5)	73 (2.9)	59 (2.3)	47 (1.9)	37 (1.5)	40 (1.6)	684 (27.1)
Source: https://en.climate-data.org/europe/romania/alba/aiud-15211/

== Education ==
The education infrastructure in Aiud is very good for a city of its size. There are many schools, with many students, due to fact that it is renowned as the education hub for the area, with students pouring in from other communities in the area. The first school was opened in Măgina in 1611, with Romanian language courses. Today, the following primary and secondary schools operate in the city:

- Titu Maiorescu National College (605 students; 46 staff)
- Bethlen National College (1,011 students; 81 staff)
- Avram Iancu Technical College (505 students; 37 staff)
- Alexandru Borza Agricultural Technological High School (487 students; 51 staff)
- General School 1 (1,306 students; 63 staff)
- General School 2 (189 students; 13 staff)
- General School 3 (1,089 students; 58 staff)

== Tourism ==
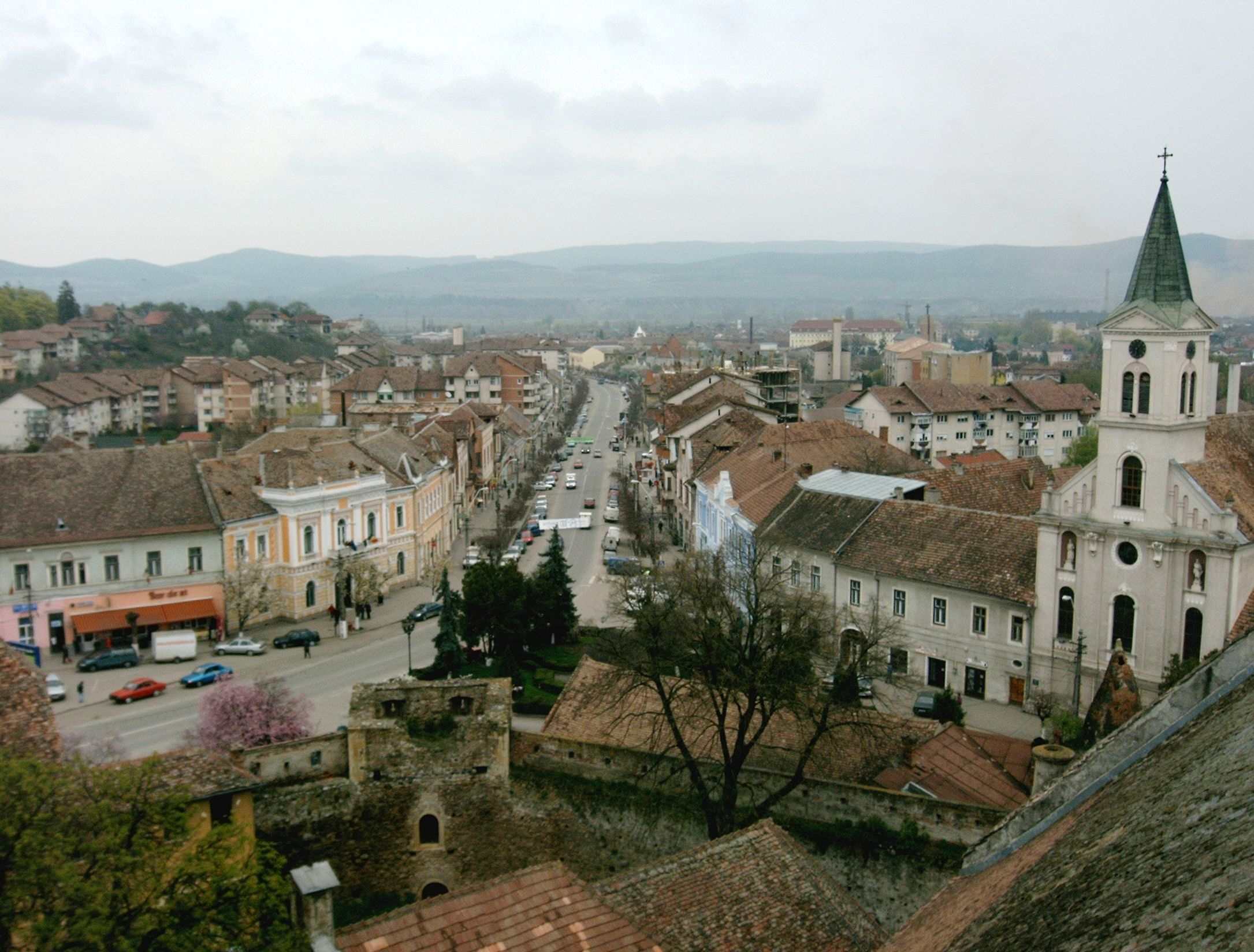

Aiud is an important tourism centre in terms of agrotourism, ecotourism and cultural tourism.

=== Cultural Attractions ===
The city centre is historical and is home to many landmarks, such as the Aiud Citadel, City Hall, museums, and churches.

==== Aiud Citadel ====
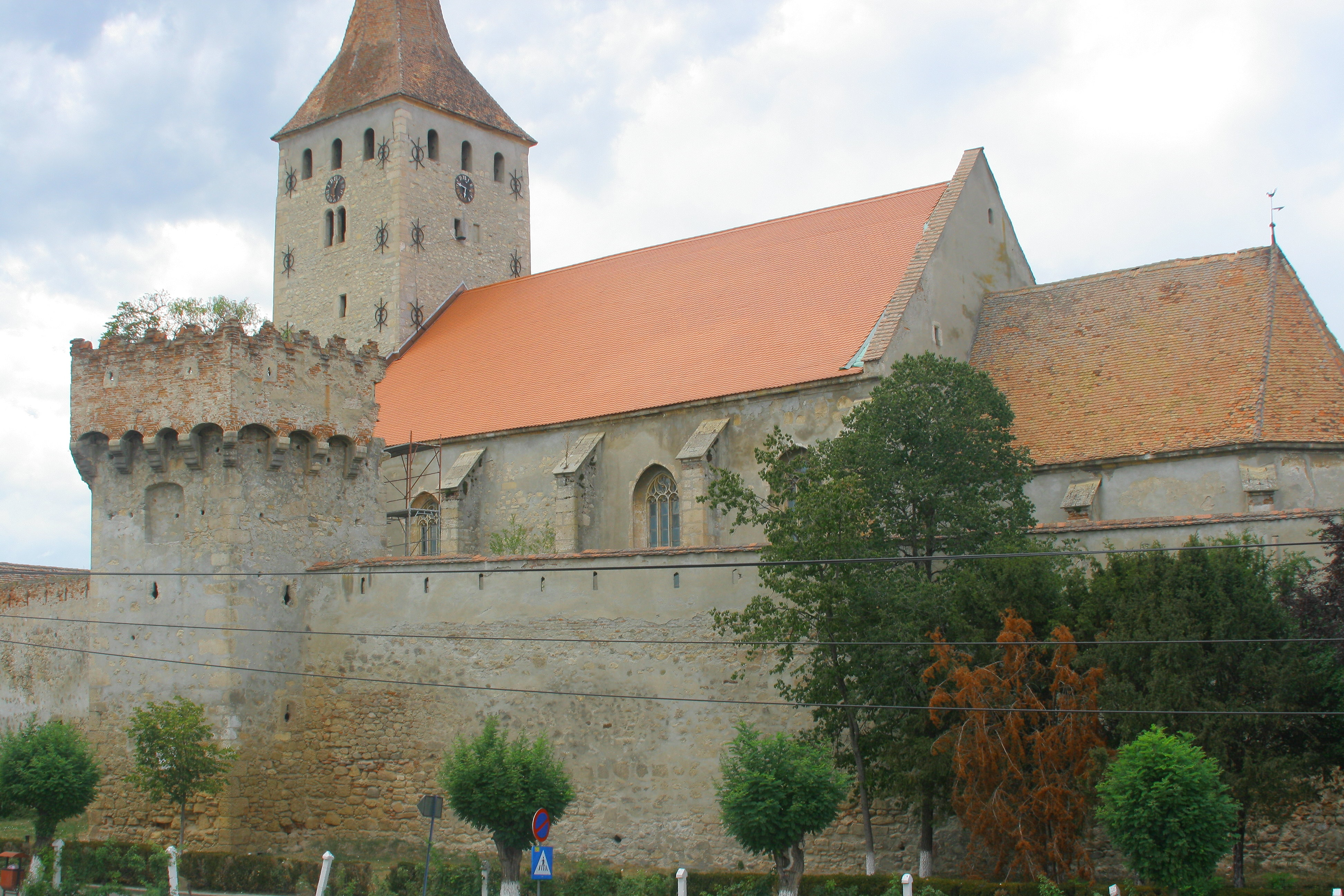
Aiud Citadel

The Aiud Citadel (Romanian: Cetatea Aiudului) is located in the center of Aiud; built during medieval times (14th century), it comprises many buildings. It is the main tourist attraction of Aiud. The citadel is fairly small, with a perimeter of 350 metres (1,150 feet), and it is in the form of an irregular pentagon. The earliest documented evidence of the citadel extant today dates from 7 November 1293, a privilege issued by King Ladislaus IV of Hungary (1272–1290), but local tradition holds that the first stone watch tower was finished during the Mongol invasion of Europe in 1241. Other important events for the citadel: the serfs uprisings from 1437; the conquest of Michael the Brave; the Habsburg attacks in 1704 and 1717; the Christian uprising - Religious war in 1758–1761; the peasant movement from 1784, and the Revolutionary wave of 1848–1849.

==== The Students' Monument ====
Due to its strong educational culture, which dates back to the founding of the city, the Students' Monument (Monumentul studentesc) is the oldest monument in Aiud. It is located in the beautiful City Park, and was erected in memory of the students who fought against the Habsburg invasion in 1704. The monument was erected in 1904, 200 years after the invasion.

==== The "Calvarul Aiudului" Monument ====
The "Calvarul Aiudului" Monument is a modern monument in remembrance of the suffering and deaths during the Communist regime of Romania. The monument, started in 1992, is made up of many crosses (6 metres tall), symbolising the traditions of Romania. In the Communist era, Aiud was an important centre where the elite of the Communist resistance were buried, and the "Calvarul Aiudului" monument seeks to remember those. The monument is located just outside the city centre, in the southwest.

==== City Hall ====
The City Hall of Aiud is located right in the centre of the city, at No. 1 Consiliul Europei street, close to the Aiud Citadel. The edifice, built in the 1890s, is built in the style of those times, with balconies, statues, decorations and interiors.

==== Museums ====
Aiud is home to two major public museums. They are the Museum of History (temporarily closed due to renovations starting in 2013) and the Museum of Natural Science. The history museum was built in 1796 and is housed in a historical building. There is a large collection of coins, as well as medieval and pre-medieval artifacts. The collection of the Museum of Natural Sciences dates back from 1720. It is based mainly on zoology, as well as botany, paleontology, and geology.

==== Churches ====
Most of Aiud's population are Christian, but they also come from a variety of denominations, including Catholicism and Eastern Orthodoxy and well as Reformed, Unitarian, Baptist, and Evangelical faiths. Therefore, there are places of worship for all these religions.

The Orthodox cathedral is located in the southeast of the city, and is an impressive building with high ceilings and wonderful domes. It was built after the unification of Transylvania with the rest of Romania (Wallachia and Moldavia) on 1 December 1918. The construction started in 1927 and went on for some decades. The architecture was inspired from the St. Sofia Church in Istanbul, and is built in Byzantine style.

The Roman Catholic church, albeit being smaller and less imposing than the Orthodox Cathedral, is built in the Baroque style. It is situated in Cuza Vodă Square, surrounding the medieval Aiud Citadel. The church contains a large organ as well as stained glass windows which were painted by an artist from Budapest.

The Reformed church mainly serves the Hungarian minority of Aiud, which played a big role in the identity of the city in terms of education, art, architecture and more. This church is located within the Aiud Citadel, and is medieval in architecture style, being the oldest church in Aiud.

==== Monasteries ====
The most famous monastery in the Aiud area is the Râmeț monastery, which was built in the 15th century. Its architecture is classically Romanian, resembling the painted monasteries of Moldavia such as Voronet. In the monastery there is also a museum. In addition to Râmeț monastery, there are also monasteries at Magina and Cicau.

==== Historical Colleges ====
The Bethlen Gabor College, with 1011 students today has a rich history. The college, named after Gabriel Bethlen, Prince of Transylvania (1613–1629), was founded in 1622 in Alba-Iulia, the capital city of Alba County, and it was then moved to Aiud. Later on, it was also moved to Cluj-Napoca for a short time. Today, the institution is located in a 19th-century historical building, and it is also home to an important library.

==== Kemény - Zeyk mansion ====
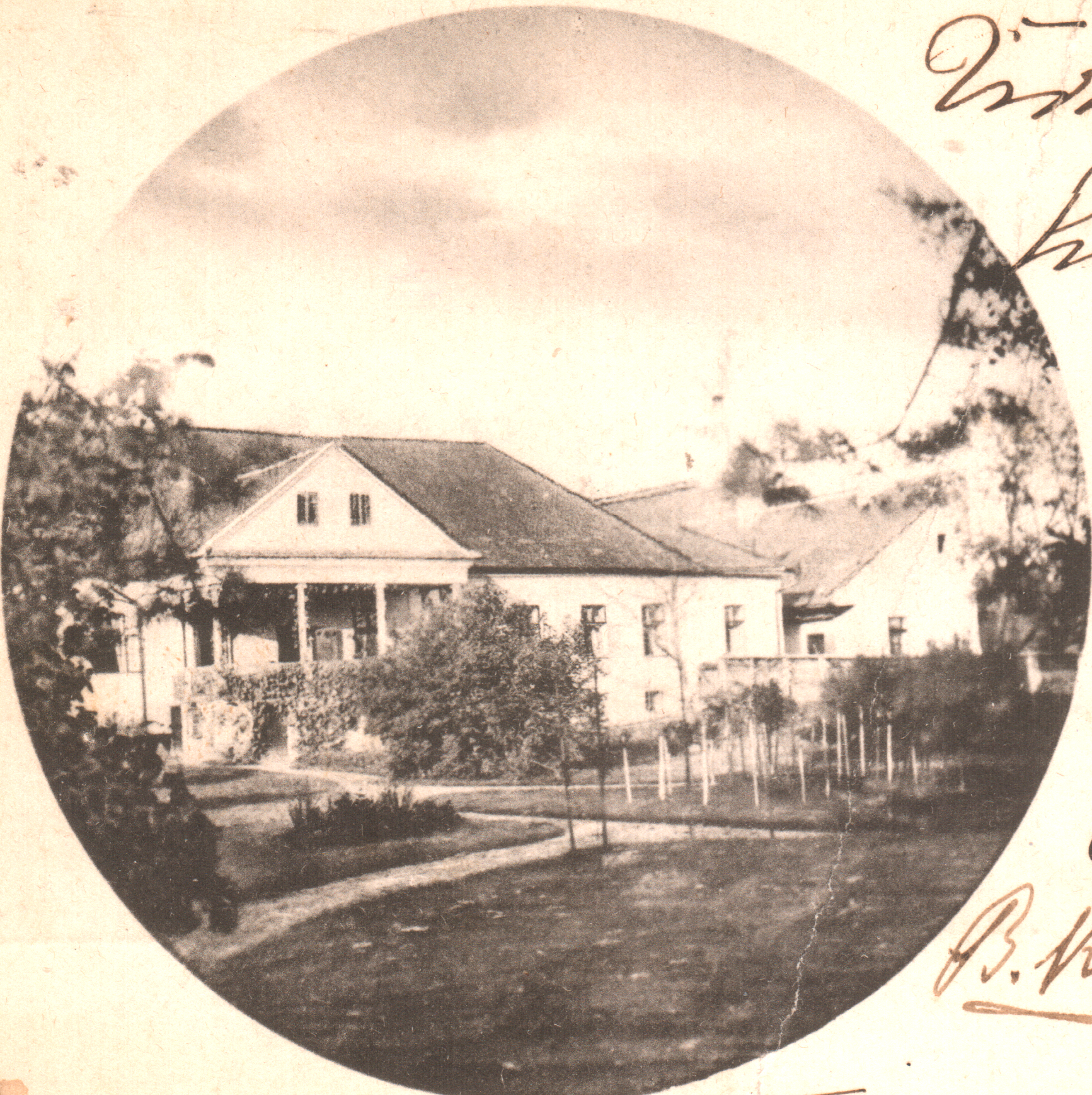
Kemény - Zeyk mansion

Center of political life in Aiud in the 19th century.

=== Natural Attractions ===
Aiud has many sightseeing locations that highlight the local flora and fauna.

== Accessibility and Transport ==
Aiud is easily accessible from all parts of Romania due to its position in the centre of the country and its road network. The city is located on the national road running from Bucharest to Oradea and then crossing the Hungarian border to Budapest. Therefore, most public coach services running between Budapest and Bucharest via Oradea stop at Aiud.

=== Railways ===
Aiud is an important railway hub and is served frequently by CFR national trains. It is located on the main line from Oradea to Bucharest via Cluj-Napoca. Consequently, there are 46 trains passing daily through Aiud (with very frequent connections to main cities), to and from the following main cities:

- Cluj-Napoca - 18 trains daily
- Alba Iulia - 10 trains daily
- Brașov, Sighișoara, and Ploiești - 5 trains daily
- Bucharest, Deva, Târgu Mureș, and Timișoara - 4 trains daily
- Sibiu - 3 trains daily
- Oradea, Huedin, Arad, Satu Mare, Constanța, Mangalia, Suceava, Iași - 2 trains daily
- Craiova and Sighetu Marmației - 1 train daily

(The number of trains daily indicates trains in both directions. For example, to Cluj-Napoca there are 18 trains daily, meaning there are 18 trains to Cluj-Napoca and 18 trains from Cluj-Napoca, for a total of 36 services.)

== Health ==
In Aiud, there is a hospital built in 1993. It has 318 beds and 15 sections. There are also radiology services, 24-hour emergency services and a large ambulance station, making the hospital one of the better-equipped in the region. Nearby, there is also a medical centre with 14 specialised cabinets. There is also a tuberculosis sanatory in Aiud, and it is situated in the southeast of the city. This hospital was built in 1914 and currently has 220 beds.
