= Izvoare, Fălești =

Izvoare
- Village
- Location within Moldova
- Coordinates: 47.4344444444°N 27.6722222222°E
- Country: Moldova
- District: Fălești District

Government
  - Mayor: Sergiu Strechi (PLDM)

Population (2014 census)
  - Total: 1,873
- Time zone: UTC+2 (EET)
  - Summer (DST): UTC+3 (EEST)

Izvoare is a village in Fălești District, Moldova.
