= Isnovăț =

- Location within Romania

Location
- Country: Romania
- Counties: Botoșani County
- Villages: Horodiștea, Rediu

Physical characteristics
- Mouth: Prut
  - coordinates: 48.2498°N 26.7988°E
- Length: 14 km (8.7 mi)
- Basin size: 40 km^{2} (15 sq mi)
- Discharge
  - location: *
  - minimum: 0 m^{3}/s (0 cu ft/s)
  - maximum: 34.50 m^{3}/s (1,218 cu ft/s)

Basin features
- Progression: Prut→ Danube→ Black Sea
- River code: XIII.1.5

The Isnovăț is a right tributary of the river Prut in Romania. It flows into the Prut in Rădăuți-Prut. Its length is 14 km (8.7 mi) and its basin size is 40 km^{2} (15 sq mi).
