= Izvor (Mureș) =

Izvor Izvor-patak
- Location within Romania

Location
- Country: Romania
- Counties: Arad County
- Villages: Birchiș

Physical characteristics
- Mouth: Mureș
  - coordinates: 45.9964°N 22.1566°E
- Length: 10 km (6.2 mi)
- Basin size: 25 km^{2} (9.7 sq mi)

Basin features
- Progression: Mureș→ Tisza→ Danube→ Black Sea

The Izvor (Hungarian: Izvor-patak) is a left tributary of the river Mureș in Romania. It discharges into the Mureș in Birchiș. Its length is 10 km (6.2 mi) and its basin size is 25 km^{2} (9.7 sq mi).
