= Aiud (river) =

River in Alba, Romania

Aiud Aiudul de Sus, Enyed-patak
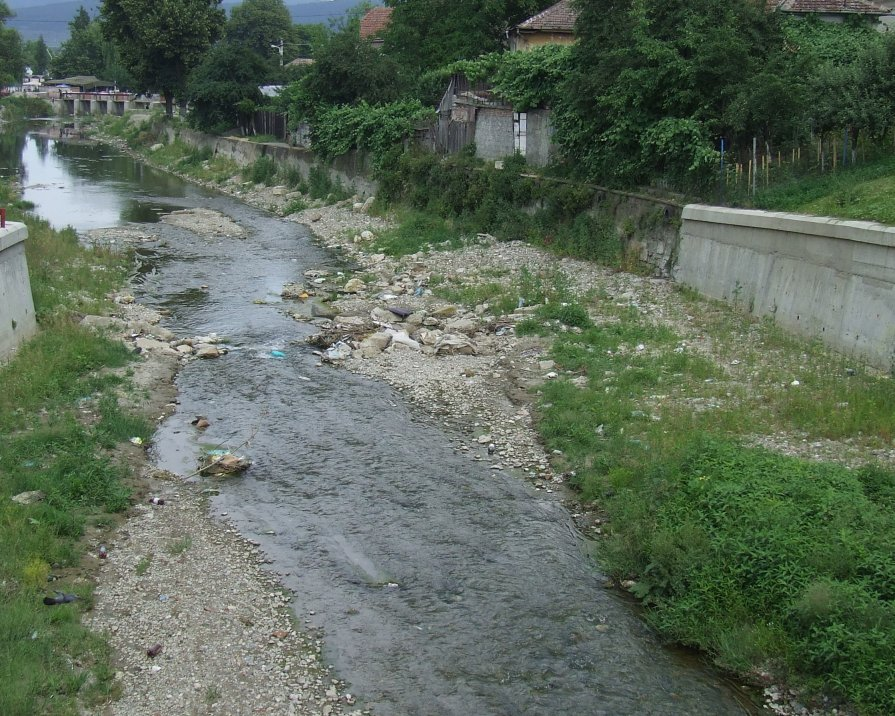
- The river Aiud in the city of Aiud

- Location within Romania

Location
- Country: Romania
- Counties: Alba County
- Villages: Poiana Aiudului, Livezile, Aiudul de Sus, Aiud

Physical characteristics
- Mouth: Mureș
  - location: Aiud
  - coordinates: 46.3187°N 23.7471°E
- Length: 27 km (17 mi)
- Basin size: 182 km^{2} (70 sq mi)

Basin features
- Progression: Mureș→ Tisza→ Danube→ Black Sea
- Tributaries
  - left: Rachiș
  - right: Izvoarele, Inzel, Neau

The Aiud or Aiudul de Sus (Hungarian: Enyed-patak) is a left tributary of the river Mureș in Transylvania, Romania.

== Course and description ==
It discharges into the Mureș in Aiud. The upper reach is also known as Siloș. Its length is 27 km (17 mi) and its basin size is 182 km^{2} (70 sq mi).
