= Izvor, Lipkovo =

Izvor
- Village
- Извор
- Location within North Macedonia
- Coordinates: 42°12′12″N 21°34′41″E
- Country: North Macedonia
- Region: Southeastern
- Municipality: Lipkovo

Population (2002)
  - Total: 4
- Time zone: UTC+1 (CET)
  - Summer (DST): UTC+2 (CEST)
- Car plates: KU
- Website: .

Izvor (Macedonian: Извор, Albanian: Izvor) is a village in the municipality of Lipkovo, North Macedonia.

== Demographics ==
According to the 2002 census, the village had a total of 4 inhabitants. Ethnic groups in the village include:

- Albanians 4
