= Izvorul cu Hotar River =

Izvorul cu Hotar River may refer to:

- Izvorul cu Hotar, a tributary of the Latorița in Vâlcea County
- Izvorul cu Hotar, a tributary of the Lotru in Vâlcea County

== See also ==
- Hotar River (disambiguation)
- Hotaru River (disambiguation)
- Hotarul River (disambiguation)
