= Micești (river) =

Micești Păuleasca
- Location within Romania

Location
- Country: Romania
- Counties: Argeș County
- Villages: Păuleasca, Micești

Physical characteristics
- Mouth: Râul Doamnei
  - location: Colibași
  - coordinates: 44.9390°N 24.8971°E
- Length: 22 km (14 mi)
- Basin size: 37 km^{2} (14 sq mi)

Basin features
- Progression: Râul Doamnei→ Argeș→ Danube→ Black Sea
- Tributaries
  - left: Porcărețu

The Micești or Păuleasca is a right tributary of the Râul Doamnei in Romania. It flows into the Râul Doamnei in Colibași. Its length is 22 km (14 mi) and its basin size is 37 km^{2} (14 sq mi).
