= Izvorul Gropii =

Izvorul Gropii may refer to:

- Izvorul Gropii, a tributary of the Lotru in Vâlcea County
- Izvorul Gropii, a tributary of the Bâsculița in Buzău County

== See also ==
- Groapa (disambiguation)
