= Jijila (river) =

Jijila Dereaua
- Location within Romania

Location
- Country: Romania
- Counties: Tulcea County
- Villages: Jijila

Physical characteristics
- Source: Măcin Mountains
- Mouth: Danube, Lake Jijila
  - coordinates: 45.3374°N 28.1099°E
- Length: 14 km (8.7 mi)
- Basin size: 41 km^{2} (16 sq mi)

Basin features
- Progression: Lake Jijila→ Danube→ Black Sea
- Tributaries
  - right: Valea lui Bran
- River code: XIV.1.49

The Jijila is a right tributary of the Danube in Romania. It flows into Lake Jijila, which is connected with the Danube, near the village I. C. Brătianu. Its length is 14 km (8.7 mi) and its basin size is 41 km^{2} (16 sq mi).
