= Idicel =

Idicel Idecs-patak
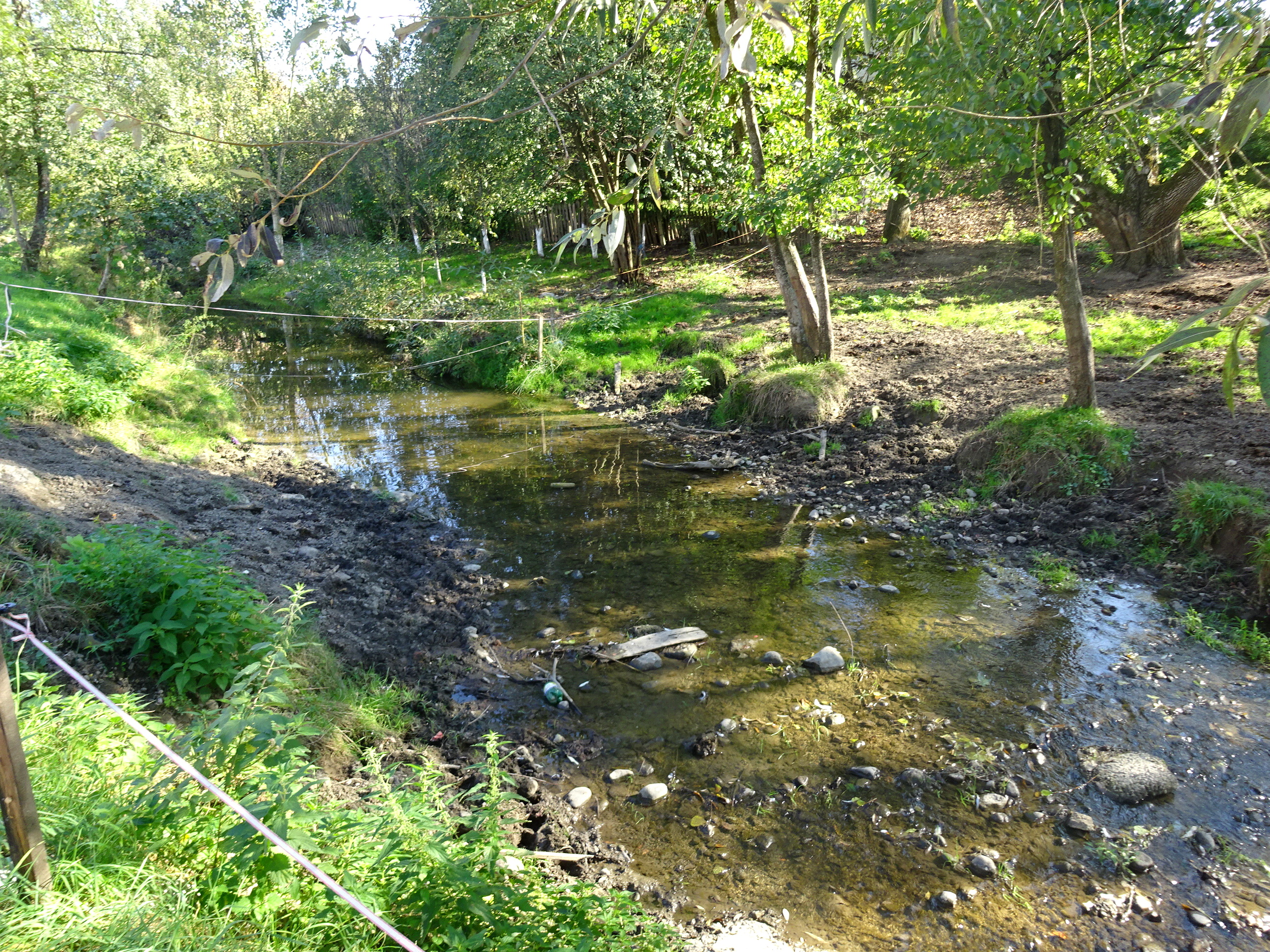

- Location within Romania

Location
- Country: Romania
- Counties: Mureș County
- Villages: Idicel-Pădure, Idicel

Physical characteristics
- Source: Gurghiu Mountains
- Mouth: Mureș
  - location: Ideciu de Sus
  - coordinates: 46.8451°N 24.7648°E
- Length: 18 km (11 mi)
- Basin size: 37 km^{2} (14 sq mi)

Basin features
- Progression: Mureș→ Tisza→ Danube→ Black Sea

The Idicel (Hungarian: Idecs-patak) is a left tributary of the river Mureș in Transylvania, Romania. It discharges into the Mureș in Ideciu de Sus. Its length is 18 km (11 mi) and its basin size is 37 km^{2} (14 sq mi).
