= Dârmănești =

- Commune
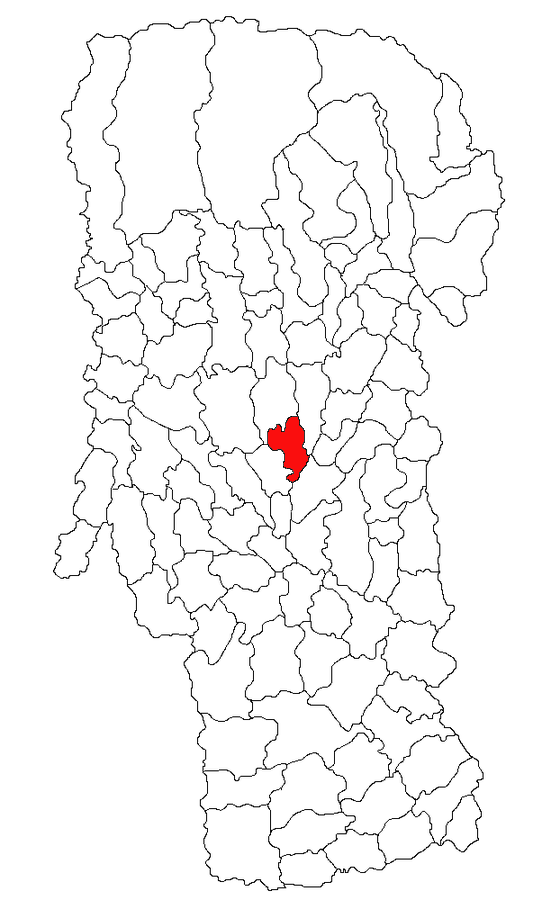
- Location in Argeș County

- Location in Romania
- Coordinates: 45°00′50″N 24°54′03″E
- Country: Romania
- County: Argeș

Government
  - Mayor (2024–2028): Emilian Ciolan (PSD)
- Elevation: 342 m (1,122 ft)
- Population (2021-12-01): 3,307
- Time zone: EET/EEST (UTC+2/+3)
- Postal code: 117360
- Area code: +(40) 248
- Vehicle reg.: AG
- Website: www.cjarges.ro/en/web/darmanesti/

Dârmănești is a commune in Argeș County, Muntenia, Romania. It is composed of five villages: Dârmănești, Negreni, Piscani, Valea Nandrii, and Valea Rizii.
