= Văsălat =

- Location within Romania

Location
- Country: Romania
- Counties: Argeș County

Physical characteristics
- Source: Iezer Mountains
- Mouth: Râul Doamnei
  - coordinates: 45.4670°N 24.8606°E
- Length: 8 km (5.0 mi)
- Basin size: 26 km^{2} (10 sq mi)

Basin features
- Progression: Râul Doamnei→ Argeș→ Danube→ Black Sea
- Tributaries
  - left: Izvorul Roșu, Groapele, Cârligele

The Văsălat is a left tributary of the Râul Doamnei in Romania. Its source is in the Iezer Mountains. Its length is 8 km (5.0 mi) and its basin size is 26 km^{2} (10 sq mi).
