= Domnești, Argeș =

Domnești
- Commune
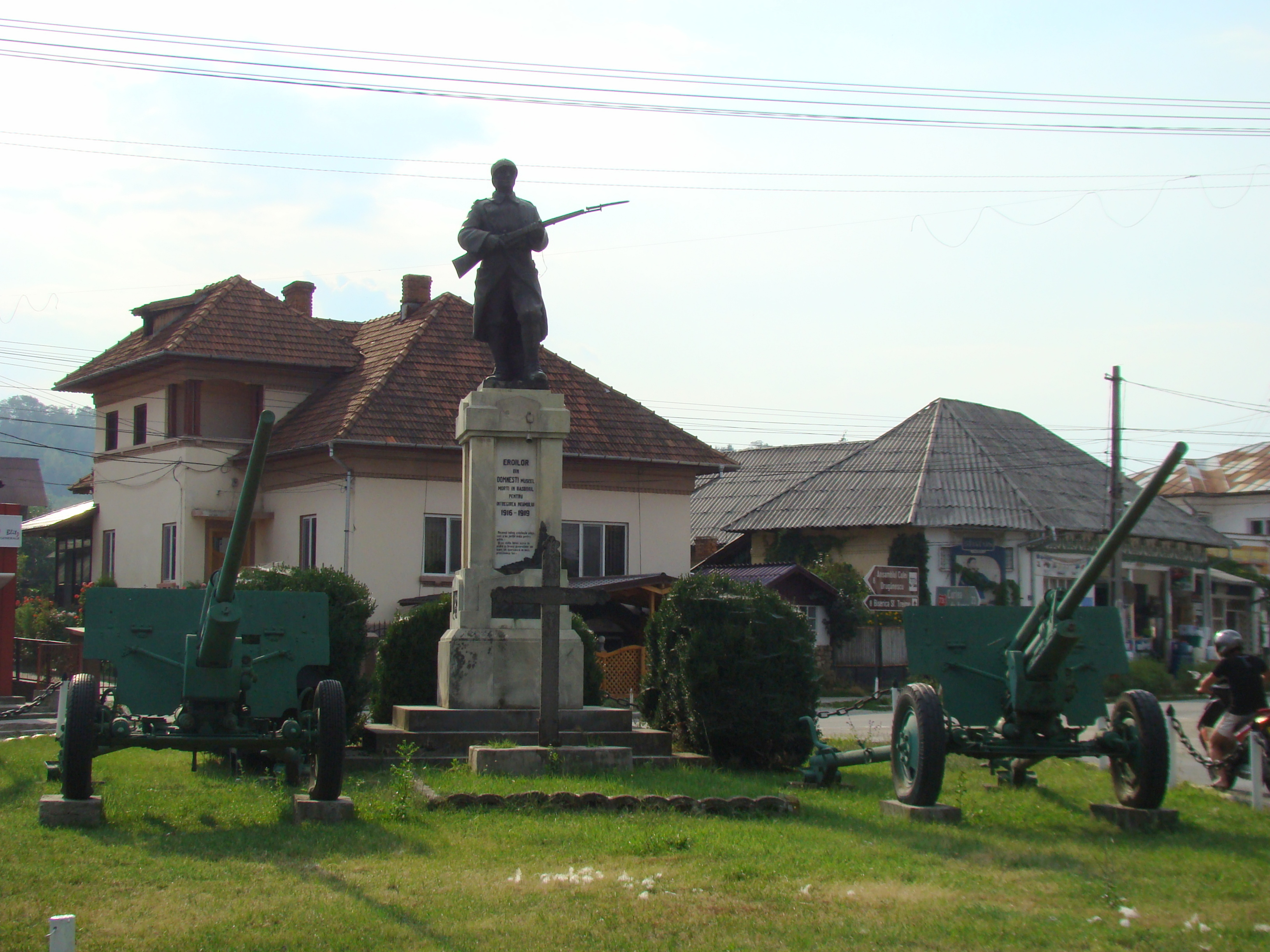
- World War I monument in Domneștii de Jos

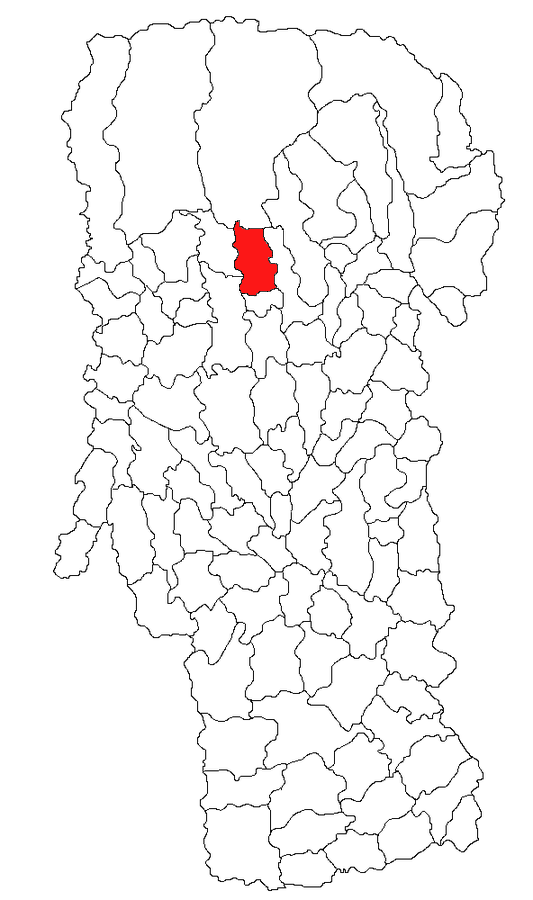
- Location in Argeș County

- Location in Romania
- Coordinates: 45°12′N 24°50′E
- Country: Romania
- County: Argeș

Government
  - Mayor (2024–2028): Ion-Doru Smădu (PNL)
- Area: 19.84 km^{2} (7.66 sq mi)
- Elevation: 463 m (1,519 ft)
- Population (2021-12-01): 3,142
  - Density: 158.4/km^{2} (410.2/sq mi)
- Time zone: UTC+02:00 (EET)
  - Summer (DST): UTC+03:00 (EEST)
- Postal code: 117370
- Area code: +(40) 248
- Vehicle reg.: AG
- Website: www.primariadomnestiag.ro

Domnești is a commune in Argeș County, Muntenia, Romania. It is composed of a single village, Domnești.

== Natives ==
- Elisabeta Rizea (1912–2003), anti-communist partisan in the Făgăraș Mountains
