= Jidoștița =

- Location within Romania

Location
- Country: Romania
- Counties: Mehedinți County
- Villages: Jidoștița

Physical characteristics
- Mouth: Danube
  - coordinates: 44.6639°N 22.5520°E
- Length: 19 km (12 mi)
- Basin size: 45 km^{2} (17 sq mi)

Basin features
- Progression: Danube→ Black Sea
- Tributaries
  - right: Valea Grecului
- River code: XIV.1.22

The Jidoștița is a small left tributary of the river Danube in Romania. It flows into the Danube in Gura Văii. Its length is 19 km (12 mi) and its basin size is 45 km^{2} (17 sq mi).
