= Zârna (Râul Doamnei) =

- Location within Romania

Location
- Country: Romania
- Counties: Argeș County

Physical characteristics
- Source: Făgăraș Mountains
- Mouth: Râul Doamnei
  - coordinates: 45.4829°N 24.8681°E
- Length: 17 km (11 mi)
- Basin size: 77 km^{2} (30 sq mi)

Basin features
- Progression: Râul Doamnei→ Argeș→ Danube→ Black Sea
- Tributaries
  - left: Ludișor, Valea Stâncoasă, Brătila, Piscul cu Păișu, Izvorul Porcului
  - right: Jgheburoasa, Leaota, Căpățâna

The Zârna is a left tributary of the Râul Doamnei in Romania. Its source is the Zârna Lake in the Făgăraș Mountains. Its length is 17 km (11 mi) and its basin size is 77 km^{2} (30 sq mi).
