= Izvorul Dorului =

River in Romania

- Location within Romania

Location
- Country: Romania
- Counties: Prahova County

Physical characteristics
- Source: Mount Cocora
  - location: Bucegi Mountains
  - coordinates: 45°24′17″N 25°28′34″E
  - elevation: 2,139 m (7,018 ft)
- Mouth: Prahova
  - location: Sinaia
  - coordinates: 45°19′46″N 25°33′57″E
  - elevation: 758 m (2,487 ft)
- Length: 16 km (9.9 mi)
- Basin size: 33 km^{2} (13 sq mi)

Basin features
- Progression: Prahova→ Ialomița→ Danube→ Black Sea

The Izvorul Dorului is a right tributary of the river Prahova in Romania. It discharges into the Prahova in Sinaia. Its length is 16 km (9.9 mi) and its basin size is 33 km^{2} (13 sq mi).

== Tributaries ==
The following rivers are tributaries to the river Izvorul Dorului (from source to mouth):

- Left: Jepii Mari, Valea Călugărului, Vâlcelul Vârful cu Dor, Valea Uscată, Pârâul Lupului, Valea cu Pietriș, Valea Dracilor, Valea Stânei
- Right: Vâlcelul Clinului, Izvorașu, Pârâul Negru, Valea Secăriei
