= Mărăcineni, Argeș =

Mărăcineni
- Commune
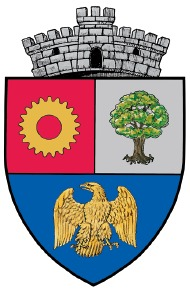
- Coat of arms

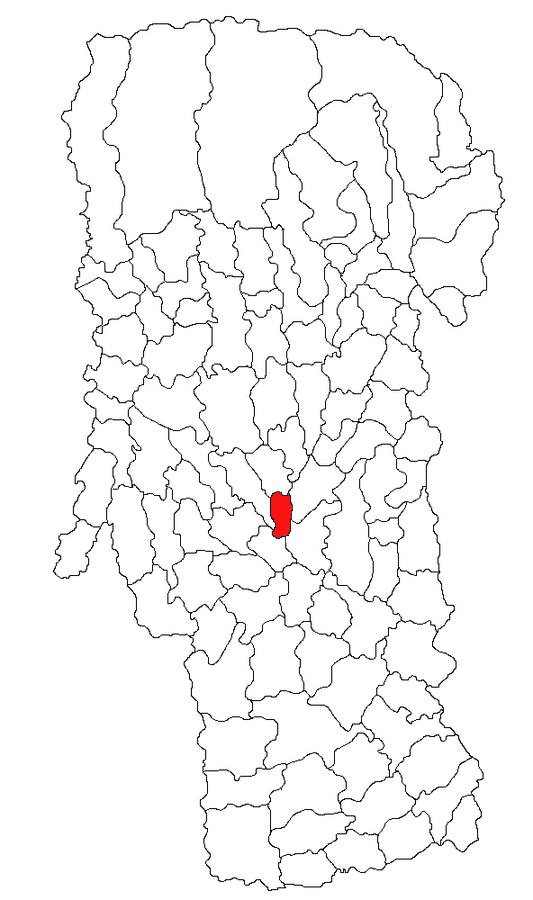
- Location in Argeș County

- Location in Romania
- Coordinates: 44°54′N 24°53′E
- Country: Romania
- County: Argeș

Government
  - Mayor (2020–2024): Nicolae-Liviu Dascălu (PSD)
- Area: 21.55 km^{2} (8.32 sq mi)
- Elevation: 277 m (909 ft)
- Population (2021-12-01): 5,322
  - Density: 250/km^{2} (640/sq mi)
- Time zone: EET/EEST (UTC+2/+3)
- Postal code: 117450
- Area code: +(40) 248
- Vehicle reg.: AG
- Website: www.comunamaracineni.ro

Mărăcineni is a commune in Argeș County, Muntenia, Romania. It is composed of two villages, Argeșelu and Mărăcineni. In the past, Argeșelu was named Ciumești.

The commune is located in the center of Argeș County, just north of the county seat, Pitești.

== Natives ==
- Nicoleta Dascălu (born 1995), tennis player
