= Coșești =

- Commune
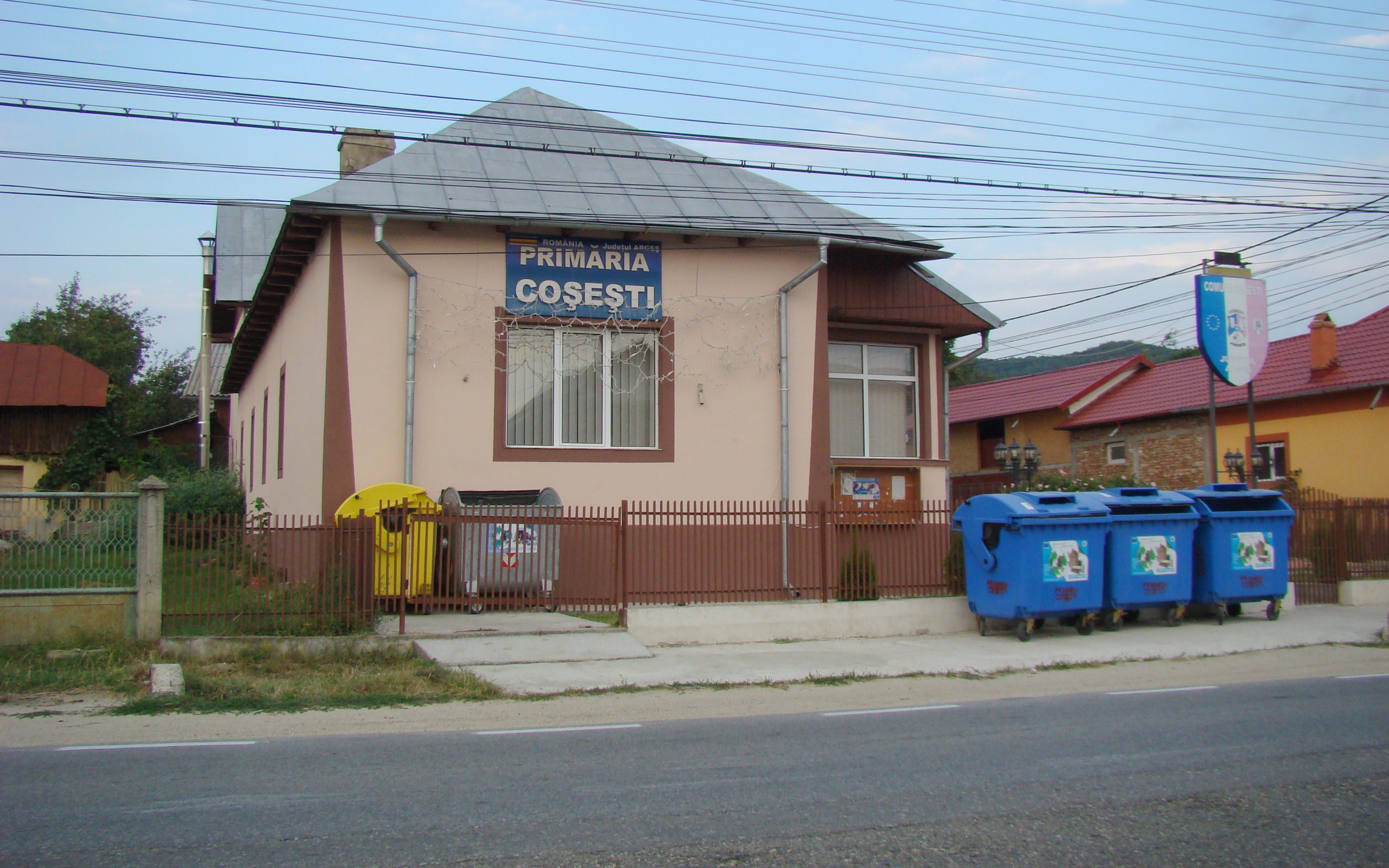
- Coșești town hall

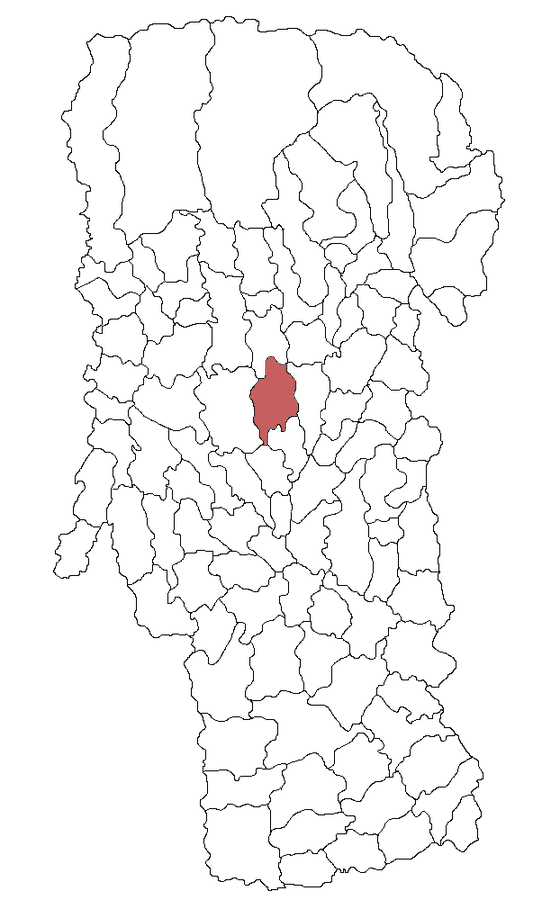
- Location in Argeș County

- Location in Romania
- Coordinates: 45°4′N 24°52′E
- Country: Romania
- County: Argeș

Government
  - Mayor (2024–2028): Nicolae Pană (PSD)
- Area: 61.38 km^{2} (23.70 sq mi)
- Elevation: 374 m (1,227 ft)
- Population (2021-12-01): 5,046
  - Density: 82.21/km^{2} (212.9/sq mi)
- Time zone: UTC+02:00 (EET)
  - Summer (DST): UTC+03:00 (EEST)
- Postal code: 117295
- Area code: +(40) 248
- Vehicle reg.: AG
- Website: comunacosesti.ro

Coșești is a commune in Argeș County, Muntenia, Romania. It is composed of seven villages: Coșești, Jupânești, Lăpușani, Leicești, Păcioiu, Petrești, and Priseaca.
