= Communes of Romania =

Lowest level of administrative division in Romania

Communes of Romania

A commune (comună in Romanian) is the lowest level of administrative subdivision in Romania. There are 2,686 communes in Romania. The commune is the rural subdivision of a county. Urban areas, such as towns and cities within a county, are given the status of city or municipality.

In principle, a commune can contain any size population, but in practice, when a commune becomes relatively urbanised and exceeds approximately 10,000 residents, it is usually granted city status. Although cities are on the same administrative level as communes, their local governments are structured in a way that gives them more power. Some urban or semi-urban areas of fewer than 10,000 inhabitants have also been given city status.

Each commune is administered by a mayor (primar in Romanian). A commune is made up of one or more villages which do not themselves have an administrative function. Communes, like cities, correspond to the European Union's level 2 local administrative unit (LAU).

Florești, in Cluj County, is the largest commune in Romania by population, with over 50,000 inhabitants. Bistra, in Alba County, is the largest commune in Romania by surface area, covering an area of 138 km^{2} (53 sq mi). Other sources list Nucșoara, in Argeș County as the largest commune in Romania; this commune covers an area of 437.09 km^{2} (168.76 sq mi).

== See also ==
- Cities of Romania
- Municipalities of Romania
- Counties of Romania
