= Tinoasa =

- Location within Romania

Location
- Country: Romania
- Counties: Teleorman County
- Villages: Ciurari, Săceni, Butculești, Sfințești, Rădoiești-Vale

Physical characteristics
- Mouth: Pârâul Câinelui
  - location: Mavrodin
  - coordinates: 44.0413°N 25.2305°E
- Length: 51 km (32 mi)
- Basin size: 203 km^{2} (78 sq mi)

Basin features
- Progression: Pârâul Câinelui→ Vedea→ Danube→ Black Sea
- Tributaries
  - left: Pietriș
  - right: Burnaia

The Tinoasa is a right tributary of the Pârâul Câinelui in Romania. It discharges into the Pârâul Câinelui in Mavrodin. Its length is 51 km (32 mi) and its basin size is 203 km^{2} (78 sq mi).
