= Balaci =

- Commune
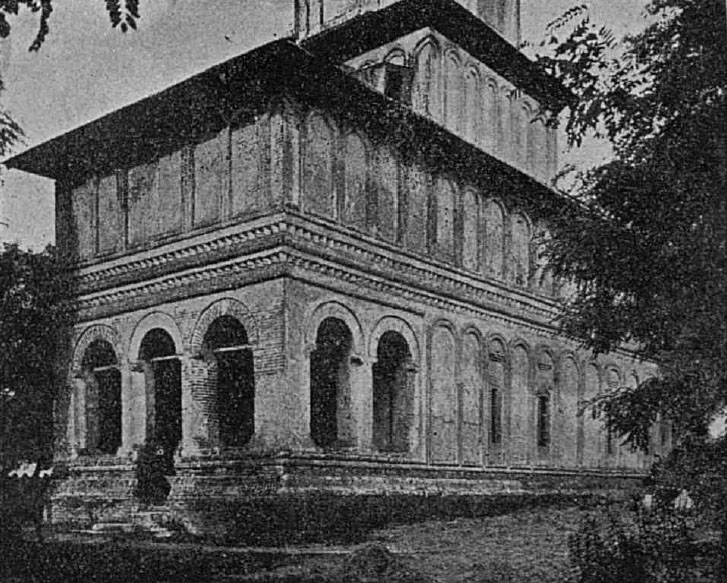
- Dormition of the Theotokos Church in Balaci, 1914

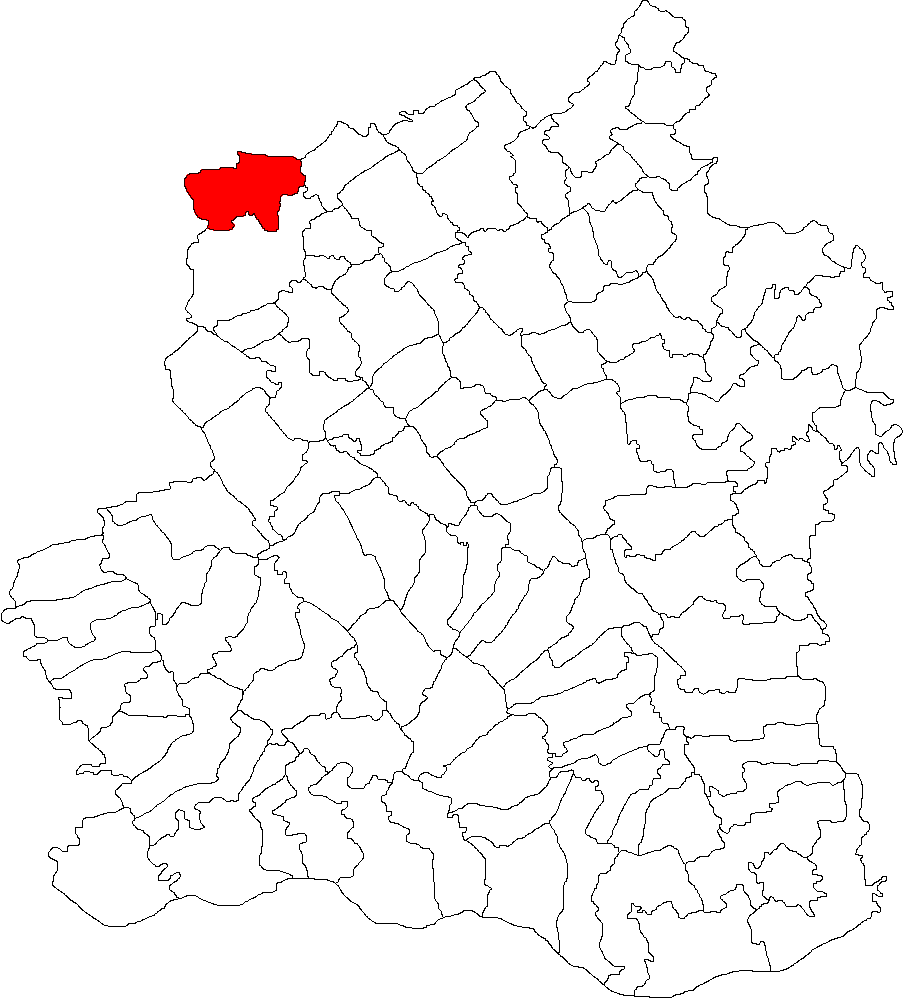
- Location in Teleorman County

- Location in Romania
- Coordinates: 44°21′N 24°55′E
- Country: Romania
- County: Teleorman
- Subdivisions: Balaci, Burdeni, Tecuci

Government
  - Mayor (2020–2024): Costel-Ovidiu Tronaru (PSD)
- Area: 64.7 km^{2} (25.0 sq mi)
- Elevation: 143 m (469 ft)
- Population (2021-12-01): 1,422
  - Density: 22.0/km^{2} (56.9/sq mi)
- Time zone: UTC+02:00 (EET)
  - Summer (DST): UTC+03:00 (EEST)
- Postal code: 147005
- Area code: +40 247
- Vehicle reg.: TR
- Website: www.comunabalaci.ro

Balaci (Romanian pronunciation: [baˈlat͡ʃʲ]) is a commune in Teleorman County, Muntenia, Romania. It is composed of three villages: Balaci, Burdeni, and Tecuci.

The commune is situated on the Wallachian Plain, on the banks of the rivers Tecuci and Burdea. It is located in the northwestern corner of Teleorman County, 63 km (39 mi) from the county seat, Alexandria, on the border with Olt County.

During the communist era, Balaci was the home of an airfield operated by the Romanian Air Force. The airfield has been closed for decades; a disaffected MIG-21 F13 has been on display in a nearby lot since 2011.

== Natives ==
- Emil Ursu (born 1964), football player and manager
