= Ciorâca =

- Location within Romania

Location
- Country: Romania
- Counties: Argeș, Olt
- Villages: Romana, Ciorâca, Profa

Physical characteristics
- Mouth: Vedea
  - location: near Davidești
  - coordinates: 44.7276°N 24.5579°E
- Length: 25 km (16 mi)
- Basin size: 42 km^{2} (16 sq mi)

Basin features
- Progression: Vedea→ Danube→ Black Sea
- River code: IX.1.1

The Ciorâca is a left tributary of the river Vedea in Romania. It flows into the Vedea near Davidești. Its length is 25 km (16 mi) and its basin size is 42 km^{2} (16 sq mi).
