= Vedea (disambiguation) =

Vedea can refer to:

- Vedea, a river of Romania
- Vedea, Teleorman, a commune in Romania
- Vedea, Giurgiu, a commune in Romania
- Vedea (programming language), a visualization programming language from Microsoft
