= Vedea =

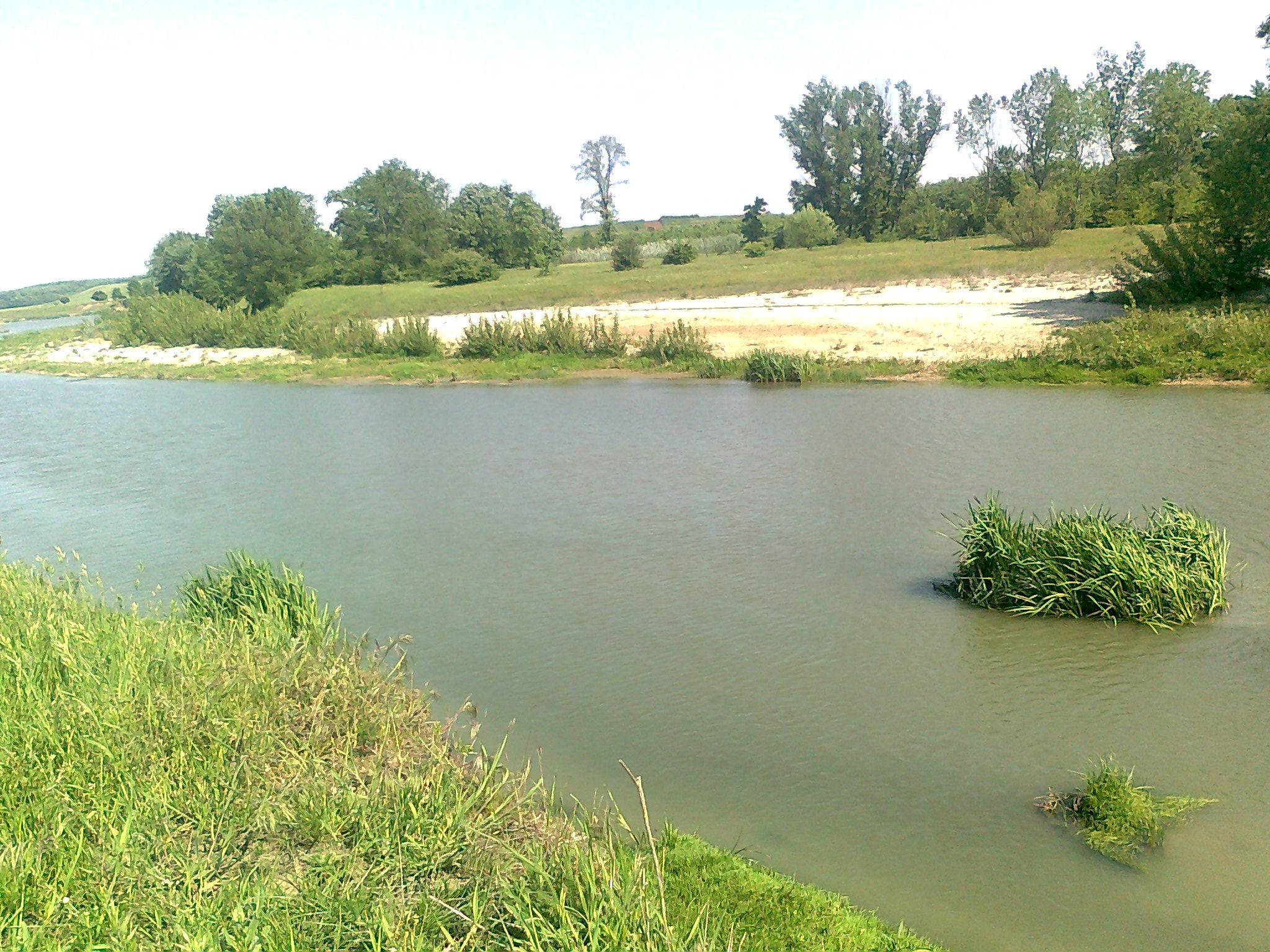
- Vedea in 2011, near Peretu

- Location within Romania

Location
- Country: Romania
- Counties: Argeș, Olt, Teleorman
- Towns: Roșiorii de Vede, Alexandria

Physical characteristics
- Source: Dădulești Hill
  - location: Cotmeana Plateau
  - elevation: 435 m (1,427 ft)
- Mouth: Danube
  - location: Bujoru
  - coordinates: 43°39′13″N 25°31′35″E
  - elevation: 20 m (66 ft)
- Length: 224 km (139 mi)
- Basin size: 5,430 km^{2} (2,100 sq mi)

Basin features
- Progression: Danube→ Black Sea
- Tributaries
  - left: Teleorman

The Vedea (Romanian pronunciation: [ˈvede̯a]) is a river in southern Romania that flows from the Cotmeana Plateau and empties into the Danube. It has a total length of 224 km, of which 33 km is regulated. Its drainage basin area is 5,430 km^{2}.

It flows in Argeș, Olt and Teleorman counties. The towns Alexandria and Roșiorii de Vede lie in the vicinity of the river.

The name of the river is Dacian in origin, from Indo-European *wed, "water".

== Towns and villages ==
The following towns and villages are situated along the river Vedea, from source to mouth: Făgețelu, Spineni, Tătulești, Optași, Corbu, Tufeni, Ghimpețeni, Nicolae Titulescu, Văleni, Stejaru, Roșiorii de Vede, Vedea, Peretu, Plosca, Mavrodin, Buzescu, Alexandria, Poroschia, Brânceni, Smârdioasa, Cervenia, Conțești, Bragadiru, Bujoru.

== Tributaries ==
The following rivers are tributaries of the Vedea (from source to mouth):

- Left: Ciorâca, Tișar, Vedița, Cupen, Cotmeana, Tecuci, Burdea, Pârâul Câinelui, Teleorman
- Right: Plapcea, Dorofei, Bratcov, Bărâcea, Nanov, Izvoarele, Rojiștea
