= Plapcea Mică =

- Location within Romania

Location
- Country: Romania
- Counties: Olt County
- Villages: Optășani, Poboru, Scornicești

Physical characteristics
- Mouth: Plapcea
  - location: Mihăilești-Popești
  - coordinates: 44.5312°N 24.5472°E
- Length: 34 km (21 mi)
- Basin size: 89 km^{2} (34 sq mi)

Basin features
- Progression: Plapcea→ Vedea→ Danube→ Black Sea
- Tributaries
  - left: Teiuș
- River code: IX.1.5.1

The Plapcea Mică is a left tributary of the river Plapcea in Romania. It flows into the Plapcea near Mihăilești-Popești. Its length is 34 km (21 mi) and its basin size is 89 km^{2} (34 sq mi).
