= Chirițești =

Chiriţeşti may refer to several villages in Romania:

- Chiriţeşti, a village in Suseni, Argeș
- Chiriţeşti, a village in Uda, Argeș
- Chiriţeşti, a village in Vedea, Argeș
- Chiriţeşti, a village in Izvoarele, Prahova
