= Izvoarele (Vedea) =

- Location within Romania

Location
- Country: Romania
- Counties: Teleorman County
- Villages: Izvoarele

Physical characteristics
- Mouth: Vedea
  - coordinates: 43.8229°N 25.4525°E
- Length: 42 km (26 mi)
- Basin size: 231 km^{2} (89 sq mi)

Basin features
- Progression: Vedea→ Danube→ Black Sea

The Izvoarele is a right tributary of the river Vedea in Romania. It discharges into the Vedea near Cervenia. Its length is 42 km (26 mi) and its basin size is 231 km^{2} (89 sq mi).
