= Nanov (river) =

- Location within Romania

Location
- Country: Romania
- County: Teleorman

Physical characteristics
- Mouth: Vedea
  - location: Calomfirești
  - coordinates: 43.9204°N 25.3688°E
- Length: 27 km (17 mi)
- Basin size: 139 km^{2} (54 sq mi)

Basin features
- Progression: Vedea→ Danube→ Black Sea

The Nanov is a right tributary of the river Vedea in Romania. It discharges into the Vedea in Calomfirești, south of the city Alexandria. Its length is 27 km (17 mi) and its basin size is 139 km^{2} (54 sq mi).
