= Pârâul Câinelui =

- Location within Romania

Location
- Country: Romania
- Counties: Argeș, Teleorman

Physical characteristics
- Mouth: Vedea
  - coordinates: 44.0240°N 25.2361°E
- Length: 106 km (66 mi)
- Basin size: 535 km^{2} (207 sq mi)

Basin features
- Progression: Vedea→ Danube→ Black Sea
- Tributaries
  - right: Barza, Tinoasa

The Pârâul Câinelui is a left tributary of the river Vedea in Romania. It discharges into the Vedea in Mavrodin. The following villages are situated along the Pârâul Câinelui, from source to mouth: Căldăraru, Siliștea Gumești, Ciolăneștii din Vale, Necșești, Vârtoapele de Jos, Călinești and Mavrodin. Its length is 106 km (66 mi) and its basin size is 535 km^{2} (207 sq mi).
