= Vedița =

- Location within Romania

Location
- Country: Romania
- Counties: Argeș, Olt

Physical characteristics
- Mouth: Vedea
  - location: Sârbii-Măgura
  - coordinates: 44.5308°N 24.6986°E
- Length: 60 km (37 mi)
- Basin size: 223 km^{2} (86 sq mi)
- Discharge
  - location: *
  - average: 0.22 m^{3}/s (7.8 cu ft/s)

Basin features
- Progression: Vedea→ Danube→ Black Sea
- Tributaries
  - left: Ulmul Mare
  - right: Ceptura

The Vedița is a left tributary of the river Vedea in Romania. It discharges into the Vedea near Sârbii-Măgura. The following towns and villages are situated along the river Vedița, from source to mouth: Gorani, Braniștea, Romana, Uda, Bărănești, Râjlețu-Govora, Vedea, Chițani, Bărăștii de Vede, Colonești and Sârbii-Măgura. Its length is 60 km (37 mi) and its basin size is 223 km^{2} (86 sq mi).
