= Dorofei (river) =

- Location within Romania

Location
- Country: Romania
- Counties: Olt County
- Villages: Movileni, Șerbănești, Crâmpoia, Nicolae Titulescu

Physical characteristics
- Mouth: Vedea
  - location: Nicolae Titulescu
  - coordinates: 44.2720°N 24.7629°E
- Length: 36 km (22 mi)
- Basin size: 219 km^{2} (85 sq mi)

Basin features
- Progression: Vedea→ Danube→ Black Sea
- Tributaries
  - left: Valea Rogojinei
  - right: Bunget, Valea Strâmba

The Dorofei is a right tributary of the river Vedea in Romania. It discharges into the Vedea in Nicolae Titulescu. Its length is 36 km (22 mi) and its basin size is 219 km^{2} (85 sq mi).
