= Bacea =

Bacea may refer to several villages in Romania:

- Bacea, a village in Ilia Commune, Hunedoara County
- Bacea, a village in Movileni Commune, Olt County
