= Floru =

Floru may refer to:

- Floru, a village in Icoana Commune, Olt County, Romania
