= Bujoru =

Bujoru ("peony") may refer to several places in Romania:

- Bujoru, Teleorman
- Bujoru, a village in Dobra Commune, Hunedoara County
- Bujoru, a village in Călmățuiu Commune, Teleorman County
- Bujoru River
- Traian Vuia, Timiș, called Bujoru until 1950
