= Nenciulești =

Nenciuleşti may refer to several villages in Romania:

- Nenciuleşti, a commune in Teleorman County
- Nenciuleşti, a village in Merei Commune, Buzău County
- Nenciuleşti, a village in Tetoiu Commune, Vâlcea County
