= Poroschia =

- Commune
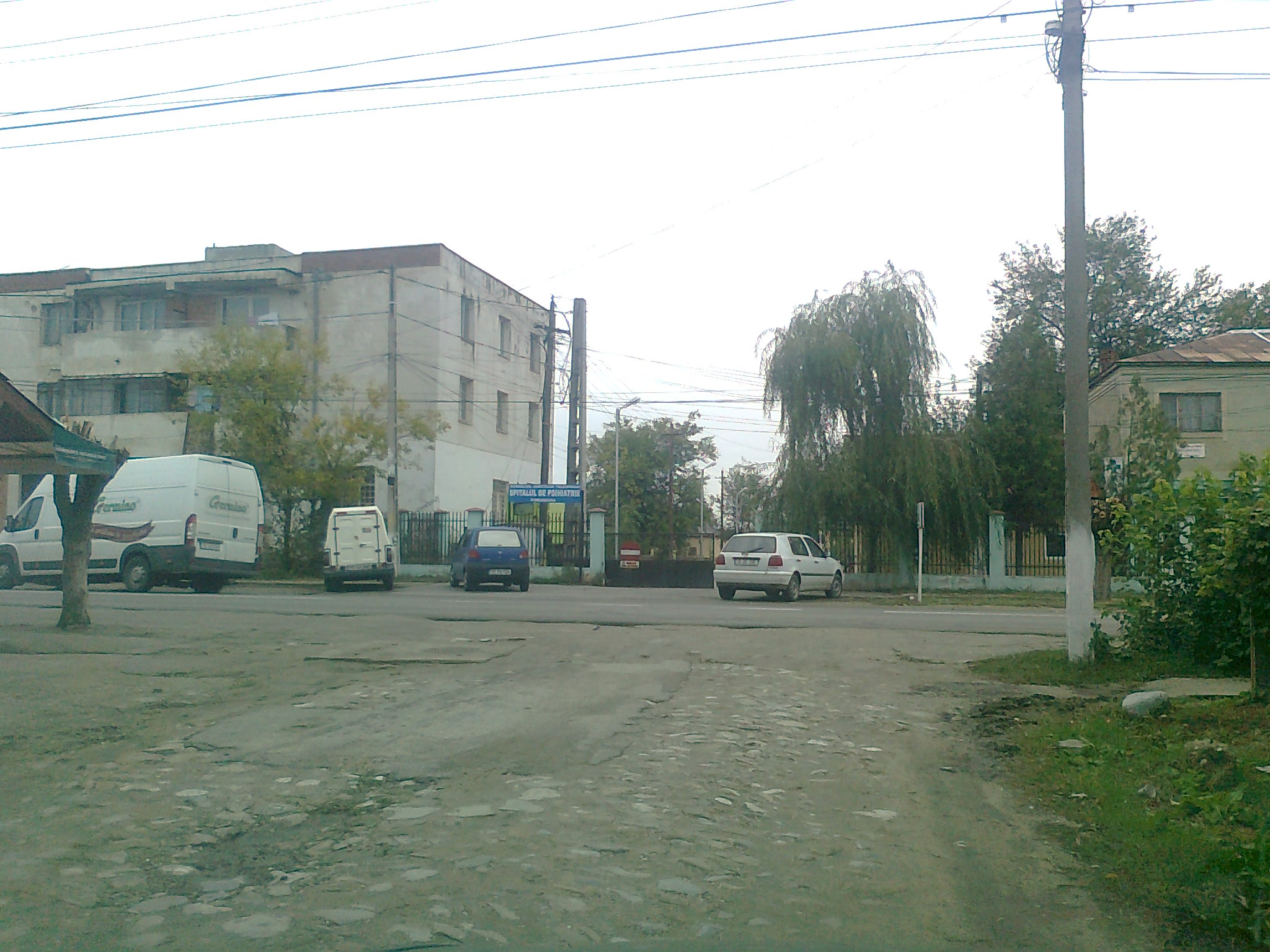
- Scene in Poroschia village

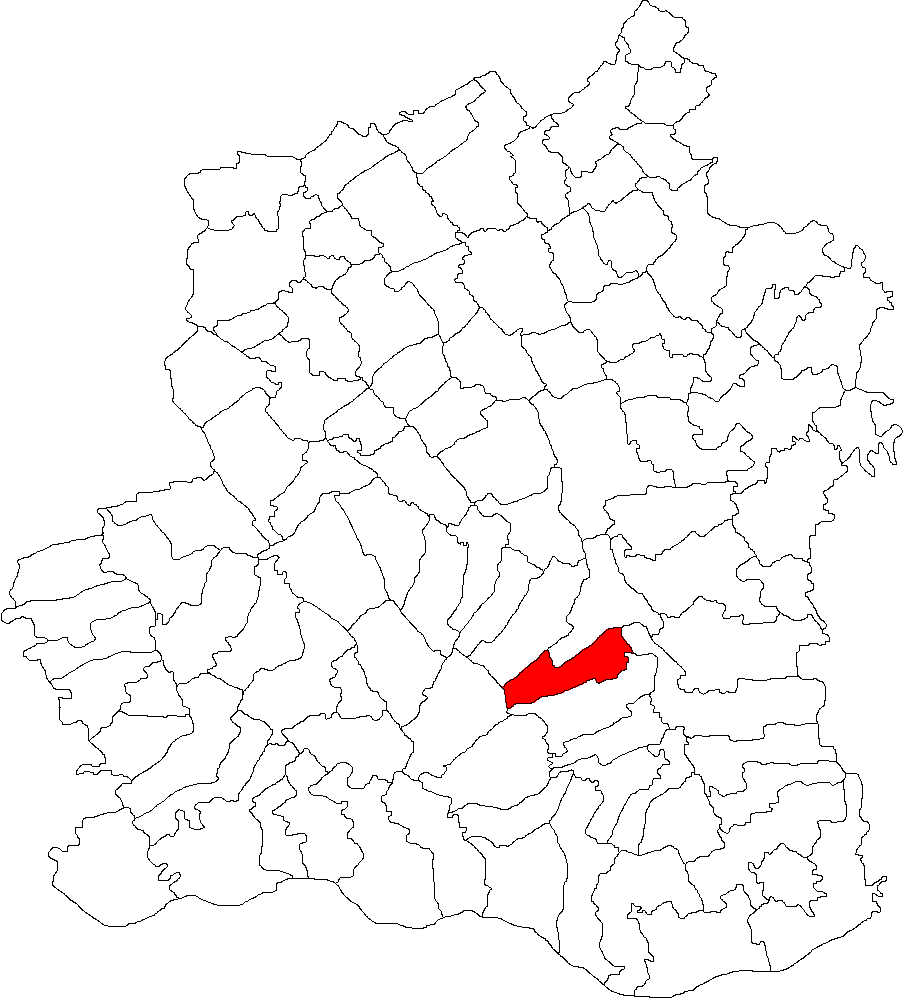
- Location in Teleorman County

- Location in Romania
- Coordinates: 43°56′N 25°22′E
- Country: Romania
- County: Teleorman
- Subdivisions: Calomfirești, Poroschia

Government
  - Mayor (2020–2024): Iulian Badea (PSD)
- Elevation: 41 m (135 ft)
- Population (2021-12-01): 4,411
- Time zone: UTC+02:00 (EET)
  - Summer (DST): UTC+03:00 (EEST)
- Postal code: 147280
- Area code: +40 x47
- Vehicle reg.: TR
- Website: primariaporoschia.ro

Poroschia is a commune in Teleorman County, Muntenia, Romania. It is composed of two villages, Calomfirești and Poroschia.

The commune is situated in the central part of the Wallachian Plain. It lies on the banks of the river Vedea; the river Nanov flows into the Vedea in Calomfirești.

Poroschia is located in the central-south part of Teleorman County, just south of the county seat, Alexandria. It is crossed by national road DN51, which runs from Alexandria, 5 km (3.1 mi) to the north, to Zimnicea, a port on the Danube, 36 km (22 mi) to the south.

The commune is known for its psychiatric hospital; with a capacity of 185 beds, the hospital treated 3,832 patients in 2014.
