= Ulmul River =

Ulmul River may refer to:

- Ulmul, a tributary of the Aita in Covasna County, Romania
- Ulmul, a tributary of the Almaș in Neamț County, Romania
- Ulmul, a tributary of the Brad in Covasna County, Romania
- Ulmul, a tributary of the Vedița in Olt County, Romania
