= Plapcea =

- Location within Romania

Location
- Country: Romania
- Counties: Olt County

Physical characteristics
- Mouth: Vedea
  - location: Icoana
  - coordinates: 44.4214°N 24.7114°E
- Length: 56 km (35 mi)
- Basin size: 354 km^{2} (137 sq mi)

Basin features
- Progression: Vedea→ Danube→ Black Sea
- Tributaries
  - left: Plapcea Mică, Negrișoara, Osica

The Plapcea is a right tributary of the river Vedea in Romania. It discharges into the Vedea in Icoana. The following towns and villages are situated along the river Plapcea, from source to mouth: Constantinești, Mogoșești, Jitaru, Potcoava, Fălcoeni, Sinești and Icoana. Its length is 56 km (35 mi) and its basin size is 354 km^{2} (137 sq mi).
