= Negrișoara (Plapcea) =

- Location within Romania

Location
- Country: Romania
- Counties: Olt County
- Villages: Negreni, Chițeasca, Bircii

Physical characteristics
- Mouth: Plapcea
  - coordinates: 44.4969°N 24.5943°E
- Length: 20 km (12 mi)
- Basin size: 70 km^{2} (27 sq mi)

Basin features
- Progression: Plapcea→ Vedea→ Danube→ Black Sea
- Tributaries
  - right: Șuica
- River code: IX.1.5.2

The Negrișoara is a left tributary of the river Plapcea in Romania. It flows into the Plapcea near Potcoava. Its length is 20 km (12 mi) and its basin size is 70 km^{2} (27 sq mi).
