= Vârtoape =

- Commune
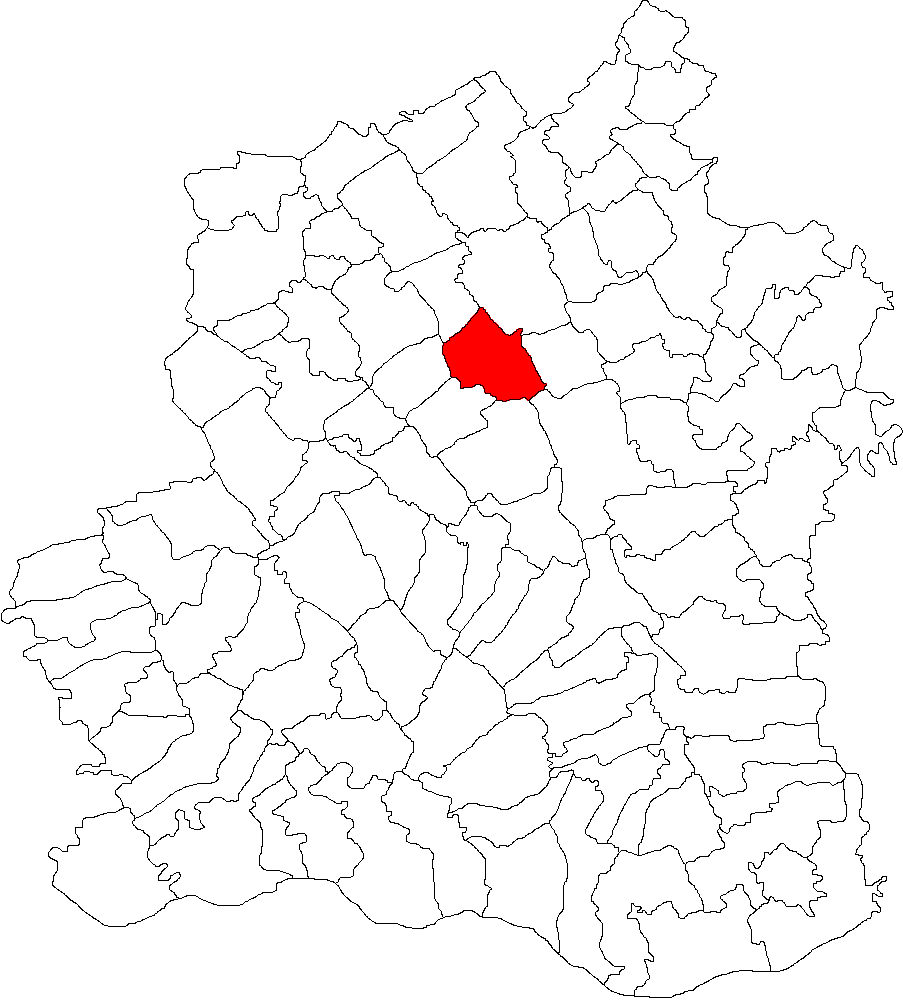
- Location in Teleorman County

- Location in Romania
- Coordinates: 44°11′N 25°12′E
- Country: Romania
- County: Teleorman
- Subdivisions: Gărăgău, Vârtoapele de Jos, Vârtoapele de Sus

Government
  - Mayor (2024–2028): Petre Stancu (PNL)
- Area: 55.3 km^{2} (21.4 sq mi)
- Elevation: 86 m (282 ft)
- Population (2021-12-01): 2,711
  - Density: 49.0/km^{2} (127/sq mi)
- Time zone: UTC+02:00 (EET)
  - Summer (DST): UTC+03:00 (EEST)
- Postal code: 147425
- Area code: +(40) x47
- Vehicle reg.: TR
- Website: primariacomunavartoape.ro

Vârtoape is a commune in Teleorman County, Muntenia, Romania. It is composed of three villages: Gărăgău, Vârtoapele de Jos, and Vârtoapele de Sus (the commune center).

The commune is situated in the Wallachian Plain, at an altitude of 86 m (282 ft), on the banks of the river Pârâul Câinelui. It is located in the north-central part of the county, 32 km (20 mi) north of the county seat, Alexandria. The Vârtoapele rail halt serves the CFR line 100, which connects Bucharest, 78 km (48 mi) to the east, with the western city of Timișoara.
