= Stadionul Municipal (Alexandria) =

Stadium in Alexandria, Romania

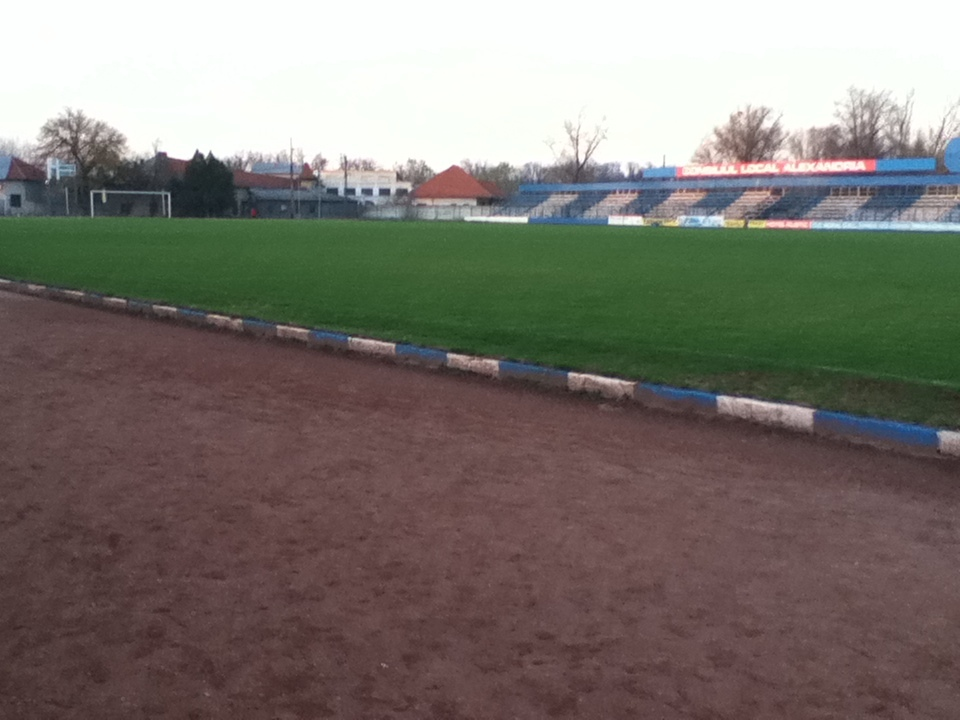
- Interactive map of Stadionul Municipal
- Former names: Stadionul Rulmentul
- Address: Str. Alexandru Ghica, nr. 119
- Location: Alexandria, Romania
- Coordinates: 43°58′30.8″N 25°20′11.4″E
- Owner: Municipality of Alexandria
- Operator: CSM Alexandria; Universitatea Alexandria
- Capacity: 5,000 (3,000 seated)
- Surface: Grass

Construction
- Opened: 1948
- Renovated: 2019–2020

Tenants
- CSM Alexandria (1948–2019); Universitatea Alexandria (2012–2019)

Stadionul Municipal is a multi-use stadium in Alexandria, Romania currently undergoing reconstruction. It is used mostly for football matches and is the home ground of CSM Alexandria and Universitatea Alexandria. The stadium holds 5,000 people.
