= Emanoil Ionescu =

Romanian General

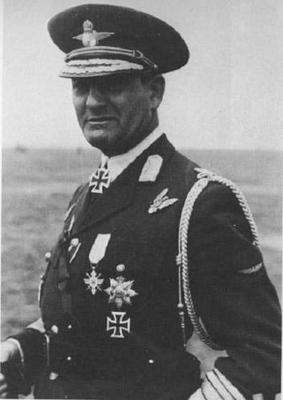
- Emanoil Ionescu on 10 May 1944
- Born: 17 March 1893; Tămpeni, Olt County, Kingdom of Romania
- Died: 13 July 1949 (aged 56); Bucharest, Romanian People's Republic
- Burial place: Bellu Cemetery
- Education: Higher War School
- Military career
- Allegiance: Romania
- Branch: Air Force
- Service years: 1915–1948
- Rank: General inspector
- Nickname: Pipițu
- Commands: 1st Air Corps; S.2 Squadron
- Conflicts: World War I; Hungarian–Romanian War; World War II; Eastern Front
- Awards: Knight's Cross of the Iron Cross; Order of Michael the Brave; Order of Aeronautical Virtue; Order of Suvorov

Emanoil Ionescu (17 March 1893 – 13 July 1949) was a Romanian General during World War II and commander of the Royal Romanian Air Force's Corpul I Aerian between September 1943 and March 1945.

== Biography ==
=== Early life and military career ===
Emanoil Ionescu, nicknamed "Pipițu" by friends and fellow aviators for the way he scolded them, was born on 17 March 1893 in Tămpeni, now Movileni, Olt County. After attending the primary school in his native village, he enrolled at the Boys' Normal School in Craiova, where he graduated from in 1911 allowing him to work as a teacher in Tămpeni. While in Craiova, he attended an air show at the Craiova Hippodrome, becoming fascinated by aviation.

On 1 June 1915, he joined the Infantry and Reserve Officers Military Training School as a first step towards the Aviator Officer School. He graduated three months later with the rank of Plutonier, being assigned to the 43rd Infantry Regiment. He was soon promoted to the rank of Second Lieutenant and passed into reserve. On 15 August 1916, he enrolled as a volunteer at the Aviation School in Cotroceni. With the school moved to Botoșani during the war, he obtained his pilot's license on 11 July 1918, after which he was assigned to the 1st Aeronautical Group. Soon after, he became the commander of the S.2 Squadron.

In the spring of 1919, when the Hungarian communist army attacked Romania, Lieutenant Ionescu was assigned with his squadron to the 5th Aviation Group in Sibiu, an air subunit made available to General Gheorghe Mărdărescu, commander of the Romanian forces in Transylvania during the Hungarian–Romanian War. In April–June 1919 he carried out several combat missions aboard Sopwith 1½ Strutter aircraft, gathering information and bombing enemy targets.

=== Interwar period ===
Ionescu was promoted to Captain in April 1920, and appointed squadron commander; the following year he was promoted to Major, and given the command of an air group. From 1925 to 1937 he flew intensely and became known to the public after the "Raid of Greater Romania" (3,700 km in 11 hours, with a stopover), done with Traian Burduloiu in 1927. From 1927 to 1929 he attended the Higher War School. He also attended the air observer school, and was sent to France on two occasions to attend other courses there. In April 1937, he took command of the 3rd Fighter Flotilla, based in Galați, with the rank of Captain-Commander; half a year later, he was promoted to Comandor (Commander). Between 1938 and 1939, Ionescu held the position of professor at the Higher War School and commander of the "Aurel Vlaicu" Military Aviation School in Bucharest.

=== World War II ===
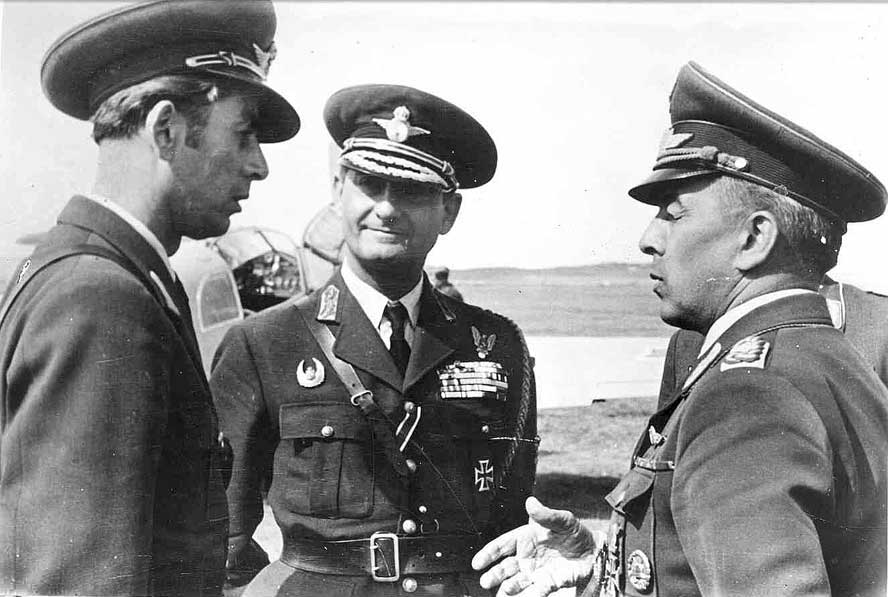
General Ionescu (center) with Generalleutnant Karl Angerstein (right) in 1943

When Romania joined the Second World War on the side of the Axis in 1941, he was assigned as commander of the Army Air Command of the 4th Army with the rank of General de escadră aeriană (Air Wing General). The Army Air Command supported the Romanian military actions in crossing the Prut and the Dniester, with the aviation intervening to stop the enemy counterattacks on 12 July. Ionescu himself flew 40 hours in the operations area under enemy fire. For his actions, he received the Order of Aeronautical Virtue in Golden Cross with two bars and Knight Class ranks on 1 July 1942.

In the next two years, he held important positions in the education system of the Air Force. In September 1943 he became commander of the 1st Air Corps, the only large Romanian air unit on the Eastern Front. In May 1944, he was promoted to the rank of General comandant. After King Michael's Coup of 23 August 1944, when Romania switched sides to the Allies, Ionescu continued to command the Air Corps on the front in Transylvania, Hungary, and Czechoslovakia, providing air support to the Romanian 1st and 4th Armies, as well as the Soviet 6th Guards Tank Army and 27th Army. He was present with his units on the frontline during important operations, earning the admiration of the Russians. On 4 August 1945, he was decorated with the Order of Michael the Brave 3rd Class.

On 6 March 1945, he was named Undersecretary of State for the Air in the first Groza cabinet and returned to Bucharest, handing over the command of the Corps to General Traian Burduloiu on 10 March 1945. Shortly after the war, in 1946, he received the rank of General inspector (lieutenant general).

== Later career and legacy ==
As he did not approve of the post-war army policies, he requested a "special availability leave", receiving it on 7 November 1947 by Royal Decree of King Michael I. Through the same decree, he was to be assigned to the reserve on 1 January 1948, being also removed from military controls and transferred to the Bucharest Territorial Center. A year and a half later, on 13 July 1949, he died in Bucharest due to a heart disease. He is buried in the Bellu Cemetery, close to Aurel Vlaicu's grave.

In 2002, the RoAF 71st Air Base at Câmpia Turzii was named in his honor. A street in Slatina, and one in Bucharest, are also named in Ionescu's memory.

== Awards ==
- Iron Cross (1939) 2nd and 1st Class
- Knight's Cross of the Iron Cross on 10 May 1944 as General de escadră and commanding general of the Royal Romanian 1st Air Corps
- Order of Michael the Brave 3rd Class (4 August 1945)
- Order of Aeronautical Virtue Golden Cross and Knight Class (1 July 1942)
- Order of Suvorov 1st Class (9 August 1945)

== Bibliography ==
- Antoniu, Dan (2019). "Emanoil Ionescu "Pipițu" (1893-1949)". Aviația clujeană (PDF) (in Romanian). Cluj-Napoca: Casa Cărții de Știință. ISBN 9786061715053.
- Fellgiebel, Walther-Peer (2000) [1986]. Die Träger des Ritterkreuzes des Eisernen Kreuzes 1939–1945 — Die Inhaber der höchsten Auszeichnung des Zweiten Weltkrieges aller Wehrmachtteile [The Bearers of the Knight's Cross of the Iron Cross 1939–1945 — The Owners of the Highest Award of the Second World War of all Wehrmacht Branches] (in German). Friedberg, Germany: Podzun-Pallas. ISBN 978-3-7909-0284-6.
- Scherzer, Veit (2007). Die Ritterkreuzträger 1939–1945 Die Inhaber des Ritterkreuzes des Eisernen Kreuzes 1939 von Heer, Luftwaffe, Kriegsmarine, Waffen-SS, Volkssturm sowie mit Deutschland verbündeter Streitkräfte nach den Unterlagen des Bundesarchives [The Knight's Cross Bearers 1939–1945 The Holders of the Knight's Cross of the Iron Cross 1939 by Army, Air Force, Navy, Waffen-SS, Volkssturm and Allied Forces with Germany According to the Documents of the Federal Archives] (in German). Jena, Germany: Scherzers Miltaer-Verlag. ISBN 978-3-938845-17-2.
