= Cervenia =

- Commune
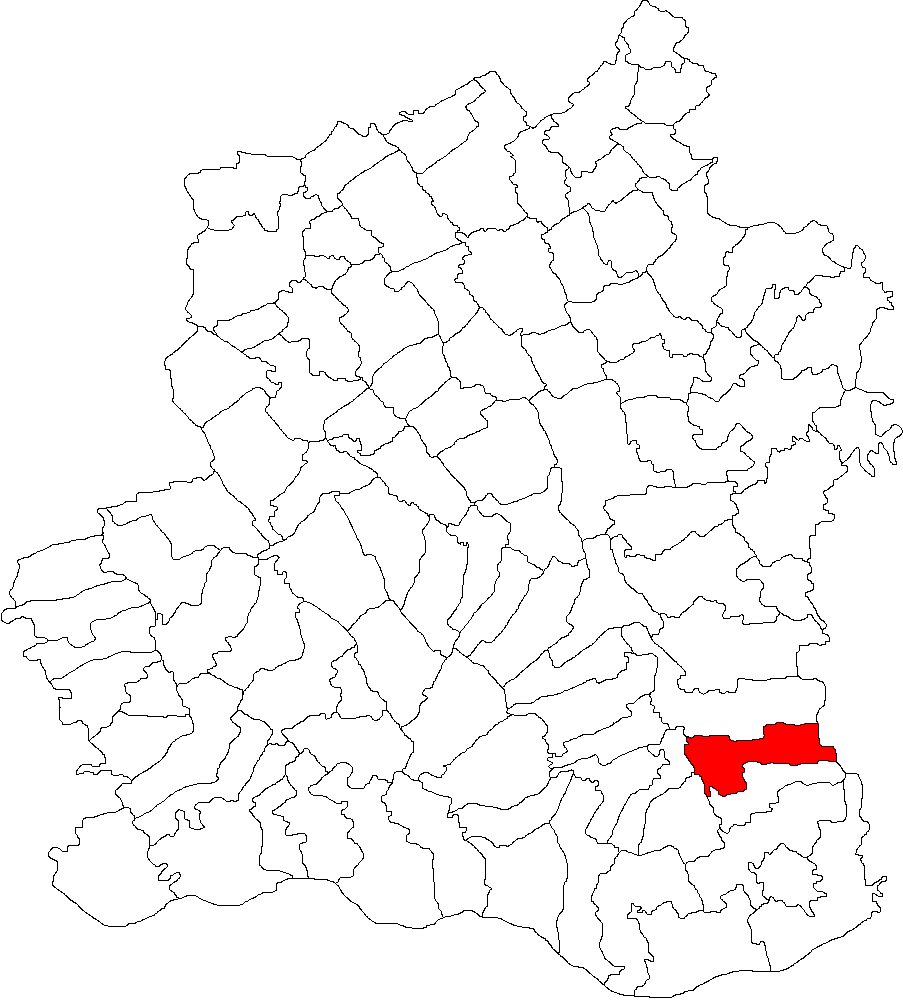
- Location in Teleorman County

- Location in Romania
- Coordinates: 43°50′N 25°28′E
- Country: Romania
- County: Teleorman
- Population (2021-12-01): 2,414
- Time zone: EET/EEST (UTC+2/+3)
- Vehicle reg.: TR

Cervenia (Romanian pronunciation: [t͡ʃerˈveni.a]) is a commune in the southern part of Teleorman County, Muntenia, Romania, on the left (east) bank of the river Vedea, 22 km southeast from Alexandria. It is composed of a single village, Cervenia.
