= Anastasescu National College =

Romanian high school

Coordinates: 44.114°N 24.985°E

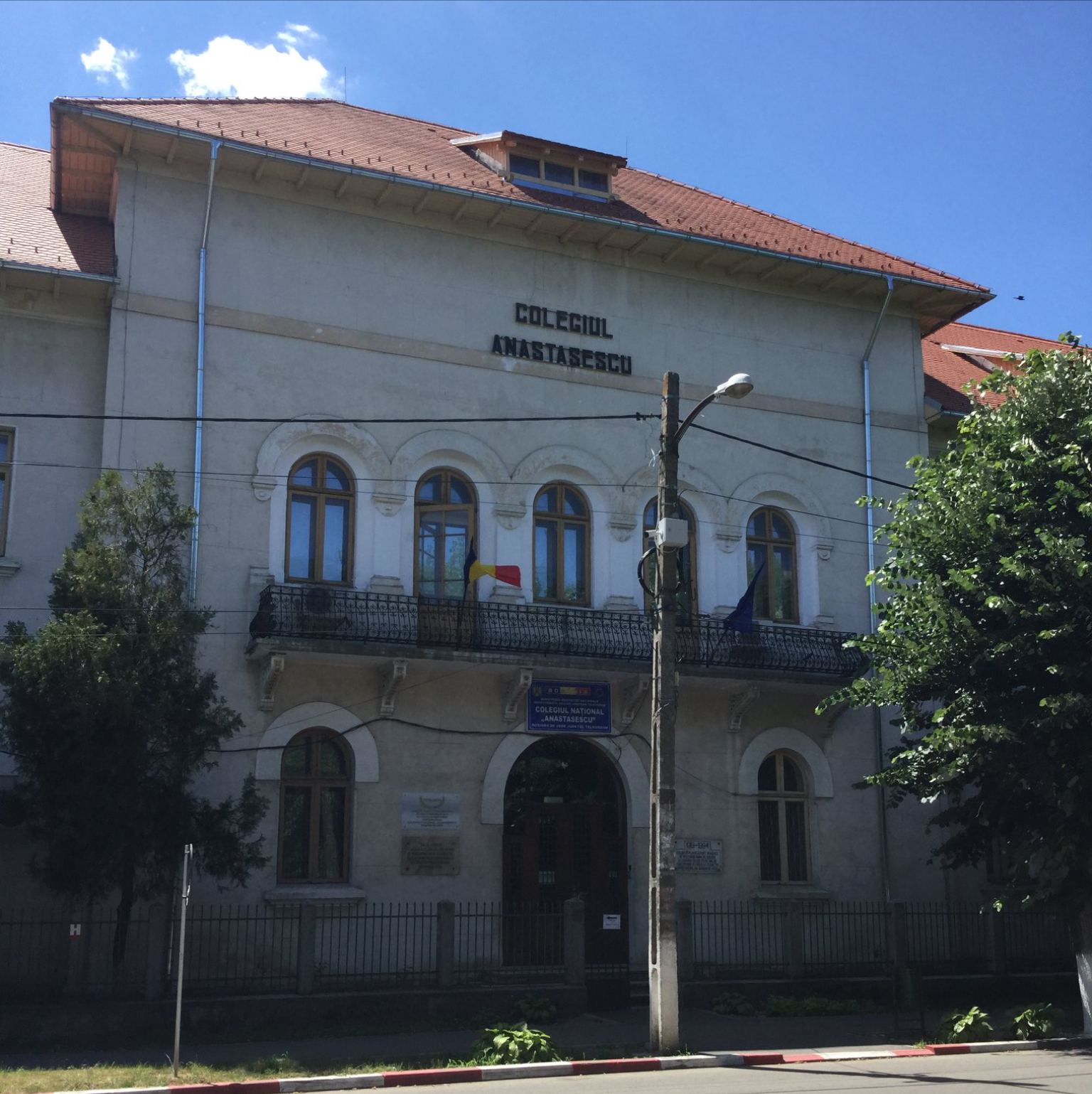
Anastasescu National College

Anastasescu National College (Romanian: Colegiul Național Anastasescu) is a high school located at 9-11 Republicii Street, Roșiorii de Vede, Romania.

The school opened in November 1919 as a co-educational gymnasium. Beginning in 1925, the current building was financed by the brothers Niculache and Ionel Anastasescu, as well as by a fee the students paid. Erected between 1928 and 1931, it was inaugurated in January 1932. The school was subsequently called after the Anastasescu brothers. The name was dropped during the communist regime, but revived in 1990, after the Romanian Revolution. In 2000, the school was declared a national college.

The school building is listed as a historic monument by Romania's Ministry of Culture and Religious Affairs.
