= Adrian Bădulescu =

Romanian politician (born 1967)

Member of the Chamber of Deputies of Romania
- In office 19 December 2008 – 18 December 2012

Personal details
- Born: July 11, 1967 (age 58) Alexandria, Romania
- Party: National Liberal Party (2014-present)
- Other political affiliations: Democratic Party (2004-2007); Democratic-Liberal Party (2007-2014)

Adrian Bădulescu (born 11 July 1967) is a Romanian politician and former intelligence officer. A member of the Democratic-Liberal Party, he was a member of the Romanian Chamber of Deputies between 2008 and 2012.

== Early life and professional career ==
Bădulescu was born on July 11, 1967, in Alexandria, Teleorman County and graduated in 1991 from the Faculty of Transports of the Politehnica University of Bucharest.

Between 1992 and 2002, he was an officer in the Romanian Intelligence Service.

== Political career ==
Bădulescu joined the Democratic Party in 2004, becoming the vice president of its Teleorman branch in 2005. In 2008, he became the president of the Alexandria branch of the Democratic-Liberal Party (the successor of the Democratic Party). He was elected as a member of the Chamber of Deputies in 2008, serving until 2012. He was a member of the Commission for Defense, Public Order and National Security, as well as a member of the Commission for Communication and Information technology.

In 2016, he was elected as a member of the Teleorman County Council from the National Liberal Party, which absorbed the Democratic Liberals in 2014.
