= Diocese of Alexandria and Teleorman =

The Diocese of Alexandria and Teleorman (Romanian: Episcopia Alexandriei și Teleormanului) is a diocese of the Romanian Orthodox Church. Its see is Saint Alexander Cathedral in Alexandria and its ecclesiastical territory covers Teleorman County. Divided into four archpriests' districts, it has around 250 priests and churches, of which 35 are historic monuments. The diocese forms part of the Metropolis of Muntenia and Dobrudja. It was established in 1996, the year Galaction Stângă became the diocese's first bishop.
