= Nicolae Gheorghe =

Romanian human rights activist

- Born: 12 November 1946; Roșiori de Vede, Kingdom of Romania
- Died: 8 August 2013 (aged 66)
- Occupation: Romani people activist
- Known for: Centre for Social Intervention and Studies

Nicolae Gheorghe (12 November 1946 – 8 August 2013) was a Romanian human rights activist. He was born in Roșiori de Vede.

== Biography ==
The founder of the Roma modern movement, starting in Romania during the communist regime and continued it to his last moment. He attended military academy. Nicolae Gheorghe started his militant work as early as the 1970s, when he was actively involved in promoting Roma rights in Romania. At that time, Roma faced many forms of discrimination and social exclusion. In 1972, he graduated in philosophy and sociology. In 1974, he studied minorities for the government. After 1989, he was appointed an expert on minorities, for the Romanian government.

He was an activist for Roma rights. In 1993, he founded the Centre for Social Intervention and Studies. In 1998 to 1999, he helped establish the Working Group of Roma Associations.

== CRISS ==
The Romani organization CRISS, founded by Nicolae Gheorghe in 1993, is a Romanian non-governmental organization dedicated to promoting the rights of Roma and combating the discrimination they face. One of the most important objective for Romani CRISS aims to promote equal rights for Roma in Romania, to fight against discrimination and to improve their social inclusion. The organization works to raise public awareness, provide legal assistance to Roma and advocate for inclusive public policies.

== Works ==
- Nicolae Gheorghe; Andrzej Mirga (12 March 2001). "The Roma in the Twenty-First Century: A Policy Paper". Eurozine. Archived from the original on 1 November 2013.
- "Romania is shirking its Roma responsibilities". The Guardian. 3 November 2010.
