= Bratcov =

- Location within Romania

Location
- Country: Romania
- Counties: Olt, Teleorman
- Villages: Bratcovu, Măldăeni, Roșiorii de Vede

Physical characteristics
- Mouth: Vedea
  - location: Roșiorii de Vede
  - coordinates: 44.0972°N 25.0443°E
- Length: 39 km (24 mi)
- Basin size: 144 km^{2} (56 sq mi)

Basin features
- Progression: Vedea→ Danube→ Black Sea

The Bratcov is a right tributary of the river Vedea in Romania. It discharges into the Vedea near Roșiorii de Vede. Its length is 39 km (24 mi) and its basin size is 144 km^{2} (56 sq mi).
