= Ion Iovescu =

Romanian writer

Ion Iovescu (August 6, 1912–August 9, 1977) was a Romanian prose writer.

Born in Spineni, Olt County, his parents were poor peasants. He attended high school in Slatina and Constanța, followed by the literature and philosophy faculty of the University of Bucharest. Until 1968, he worked as a high school teacher, traveling salesman, clerk and librarian. From 1932 to 1936, he was a participant in the Sburătorul circle. He made his published debut in 1934 in România Literară, then edited by Liviu Rebreanu. His first novel was the 1936 Nuntă cu bucluc, which came with an appreciative preface by Eugen Lovinescu, who called him "Muntenia's Creangă". Among his other books are O daravelă de proces (1941), Lacrimi pe pâine (1967), Soare cu dinți (1974) and Marea vâlvătaie, vol. I (1977). Publications that ran his work include Sburătorul, Vremea, Revista Fundațiilor Regale and Argeș. His prose has a dialogue-like character that cultivates picturesque aspects of language and ethnography. Iovescu's setting is the slum-like village, where he brings stories to life, peppering them with his large fund of proverbs, which in fact form the basis for many of his tales. He died in Bughea de Jos, Argeș County.
