= Burdea =

- Location within Romania

Location
- Country: Romania
- Counties: Argeș, Teleorman

Physical characteristics
- Mouth: Vedea
  - location: Albești
  - coordinates: 44.0658°N 25.1087°E
- Length: 107 km (66 mi)
- Basin size: 366 km^{2} (141 sq mi)

Basin features
- Progression: Vedea→ Danube→ Black Sea
- Tributaries
  - left: Zâmbreasca

The Burdea is a left tributary of the river Vedea in Romania. It discharges into the Vedea in Albești. Its length is 107 km (66 mi) and its basin size is 366 km^{2} (141 sq mi).
