= Roșiorii de Vede =

- Municipality
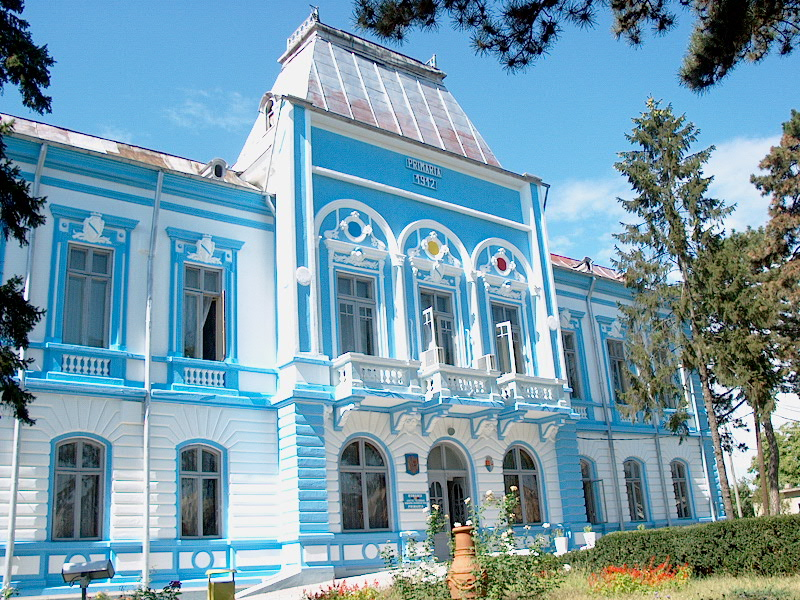
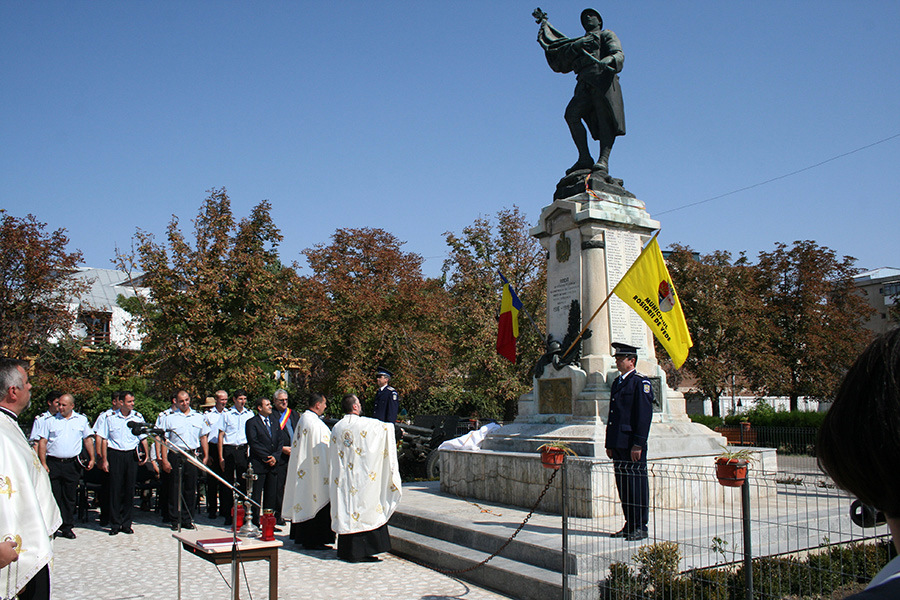
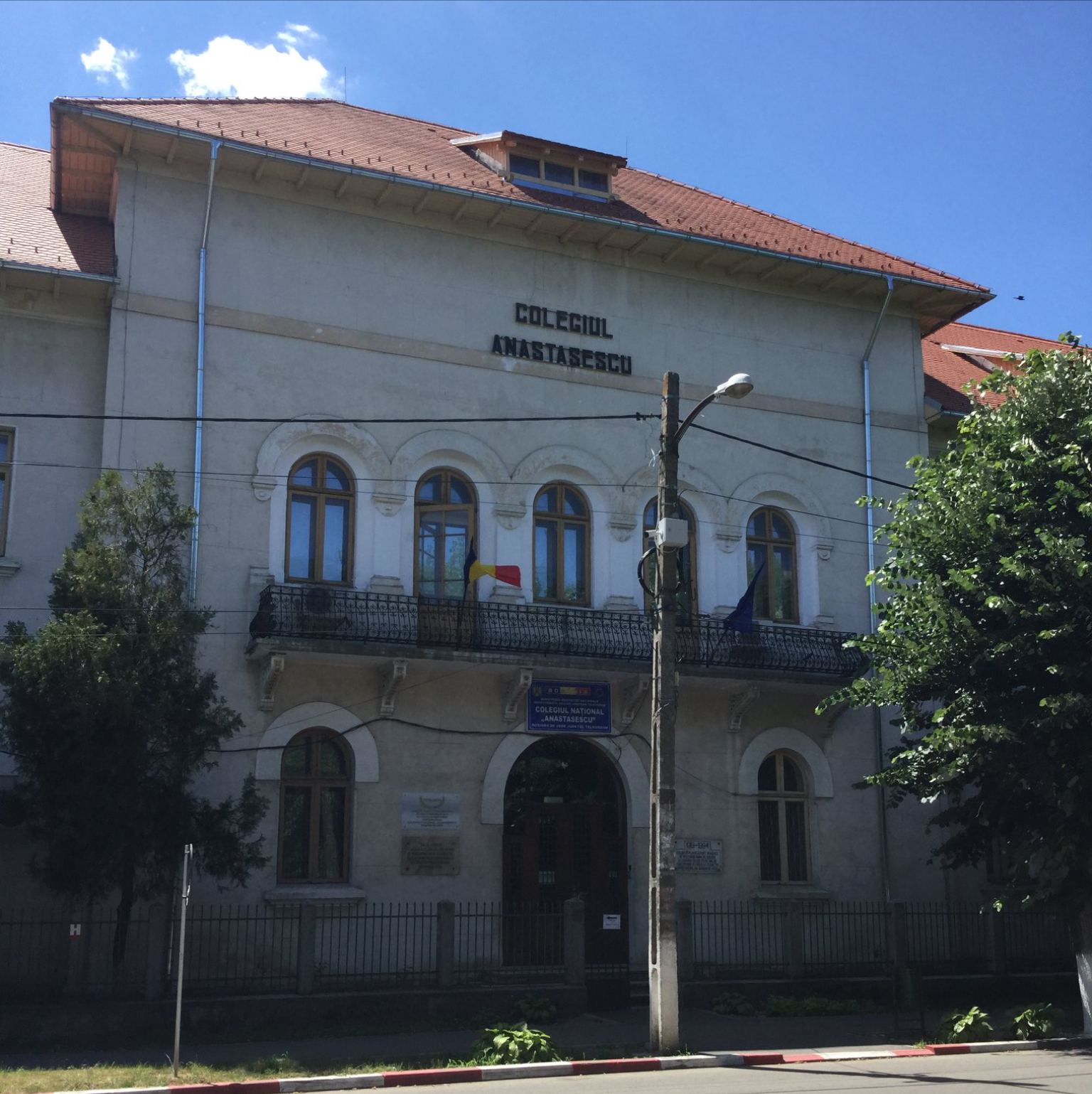
- Roșiori de Vede City Hall World War I monument Anastasescu National College Roșiorii de Vede City Hall

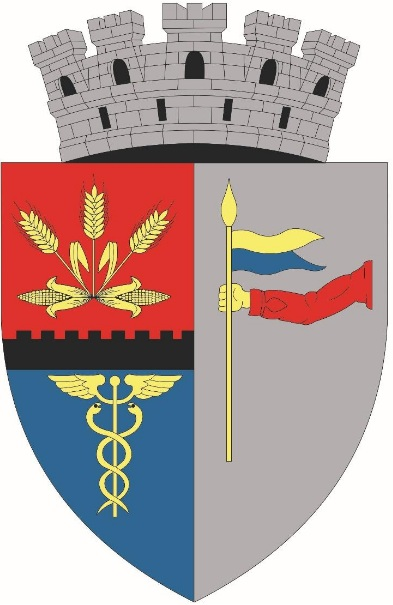
- Coat of arms

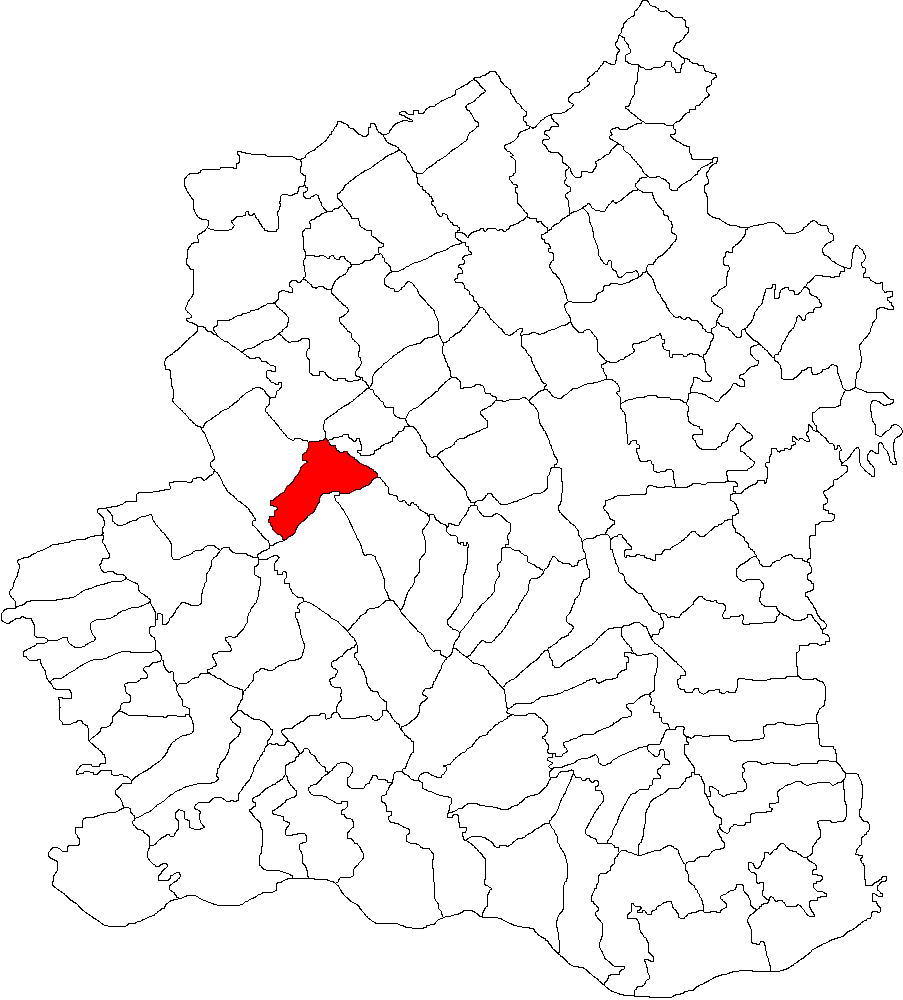
- Location in Teleorman County

- Location in Romania
- Coordinates: 44°6′41″N 24°59′39″E
- Country: Romania
- County: Teleorman

Government
  - Mayor (2024–2028): Gheorghe-Valerică Cârciumaru (PSD)
- Area: 152.56 km^{2} (58.90 sq mi)
- Elevation: 32 m (105 ft)
- Population (2021-12-01): 22,294
  - Density: 146.13/km^{2} (378.48/sq mi)
- Time zone: UTC+02:00 (EET)
  - Summer (DST): UTC+03:00 (EEST)
- Postal code: 145100
- Area code: (+40) 02 47
- Vehicle reg.: TR
- Website: www.primariarosioriidevede.ro

Roșiorii de Vede (Romanian pronunciation: [roʃiˌorij de ˈvede]; sometimes Roșiori de Vede or, in old versions, Rușii de Vede) is a city in Teleorman County, Romania. Located in the Muntenia region, it is one of the oldest cities in the country. It was first mentioned in a document which dates back to 1385, when the city was visited by two German pilgrims who were returning from Jerusalem and stopped for a few days in a town they called Russenart.

== Geography ==
The city is situated in the middle of the Wallachian Plain, on the banks of the Vedea River and its right tributary, the Bratcov. It is located in the central-west part of Teleorman County, at a distance of 32 km (20 mi) from the county seat, Alexandria.

It neighbors the following communes: Măldăeni to the west, Peretu and Troianul to the south, Vedea and Drăgănești de Vede to the east, and Scrioaștea to the north.

=== Climate ===
Roșiorii de Vede has a continental climate (Köppen: Dfa), with cold winters and hot summers.

Climate data for Roșiorii de Vede (1991–2020)
Month	Jan	Feb	Mar	Apr	May	Jun	Jul	Aug	Sep	Oct	Nov	Dec	Year
Record high °C (°F)	20.2 (68.4)	22.2 (72.0)	27.1 (80.8)	31.8 (89.2)	35.0 (95.0)	39.3 (102.7)	42.7 (108.9)	40.4 (104.7)	37.2 (99.0)	33.0 (91.4)	26.7 (80.1)	18.2 (64.8)	42.7 (108.9)
Mean daily maximum °C (°F)	2.1 (35.8)	5.6 (42.1)	12.1 (53.8)	18.4 (65.1)	24.0 (75.2)	28.3 (82.9)	30.8 (87.4)	30.9 (87.6)	25.3 (77.5)	18.1 (64.6)	10.2 (50.4)	3.7 (38.7)	17.5 (63.5)
Daily mean °C (°F)	−1.8 (28.8)	0.7 (33.3)	6.0 (42.8)	11.9 (53.4)	17.4 (63.3)	21.6 (70.9)	23.8 (74.8)	23.6 (74.5)	18.1 (64.6)	11.8 (53.2)	5.7 (42.3)	−0.1 (31.8)	11.6 (52.9)
Mean daily minimum °C (°F)	−5.0 (23.0)	−3.1 (26.4)	1.3 (34.3)	6.2 (43.2)	11.2 (52.2)	15.1 (59.2)	16.9 (62.4)	17.0 (62.6)	12.3 (54.1)	7.1 (44.8)	2.3 (36.1)	−3.0 (26.6)	6.5 (43.7)
Record low °C (°F)	−25.6 (−14.1)	−26.5 (−15.7)	−20.5 (−4.9)	−4.0 (24.8)	1.0 (33.8)	4.7 (40.5)	8.2 (46.8)	7.5 (45.5)	1.3 (34.3)	−5.0 (23.0)	−16.0 (3.2)	−23.0 (−9.4)	−26.5 (−15.7)
Average precipitation mm (inches)	31.6 (1.24)	26.0 (1.02)	35.5 (1.40)	40.4 (1.59)	59.9 (2.36)	67.0 (2.64)	64.1 (2.52)	42.2 (1.66)	42.7 (1.68)	47.5 (1.87)	33.1 (1.30)	36.8 (1.45)	526.8 (20.74)
Average precipitation days (≥ 1.0 mm)	5.7	4.9	5.7	6.3	8.2	7.6	6.4	4.4	4.4	5.5	5.6	6.0	70.7
Mean monthly sunshine hours	84.7	116.7	169.3	212.0	270.0	295.0	325.2	310.8	227.5	164.8	92.3	74.6	2,342.9
Source 1: NOAA
Source 2: Meteomanz (extremes since 2021)

== Transportation ==
Roșiorii de Vede is traversed by the national road DN6, which links Bucharest, 121 km (75 mi) to the east, to the Banat region in western Romania.

The Roșiori Nord rail station serves the CFR Line 100, with service towards Bucharest and Craiova, with branches towards Costești and to Rosiori Est, linking towards Turnu Măgurele, and Alexandria–Zimnicea.

== Education ==
The Anastasescu National College is a high school that opened in 1919; the school building is listed as a historic monument by Romania's Ministry of Culture and Religious Affairs.

== Natives ==
Several Romanian personalities were born in and around the city. These include:

- Anton Berindei
- Dimitrie I. Berindei
- Dan Marian Costescu
- Alexandru Depărățeanu
- Stephan Drăghici
- Marin Ferecatu
- Liviu Floricel
- Gala Galaction
- Nicolae Gheorghe
- Radu Grămăticu
- Ioan Ianolide
- Iulian Miu
- Robert Neciu
- Marin Preda
- Zaharia Stancu
- Liviu Surugiu
- Claudiu Tămăduianu
- Nicolae Vedea Popescu

Historical population
Year	Pop.	±%
1912	10,960	—
1930	11,453	+4.5%
1948	14,905	+30.1%
1956	17,320	+16.2%
1966	21,747	+25.6%
1977	28,847	+32.6%
1992	37,640	+30.5%
2002	31,873	−15.3%
2011	24,222	−24.0%
2021	22,294	−8.0%
Source: Census data
