= Săceni =

- Commune
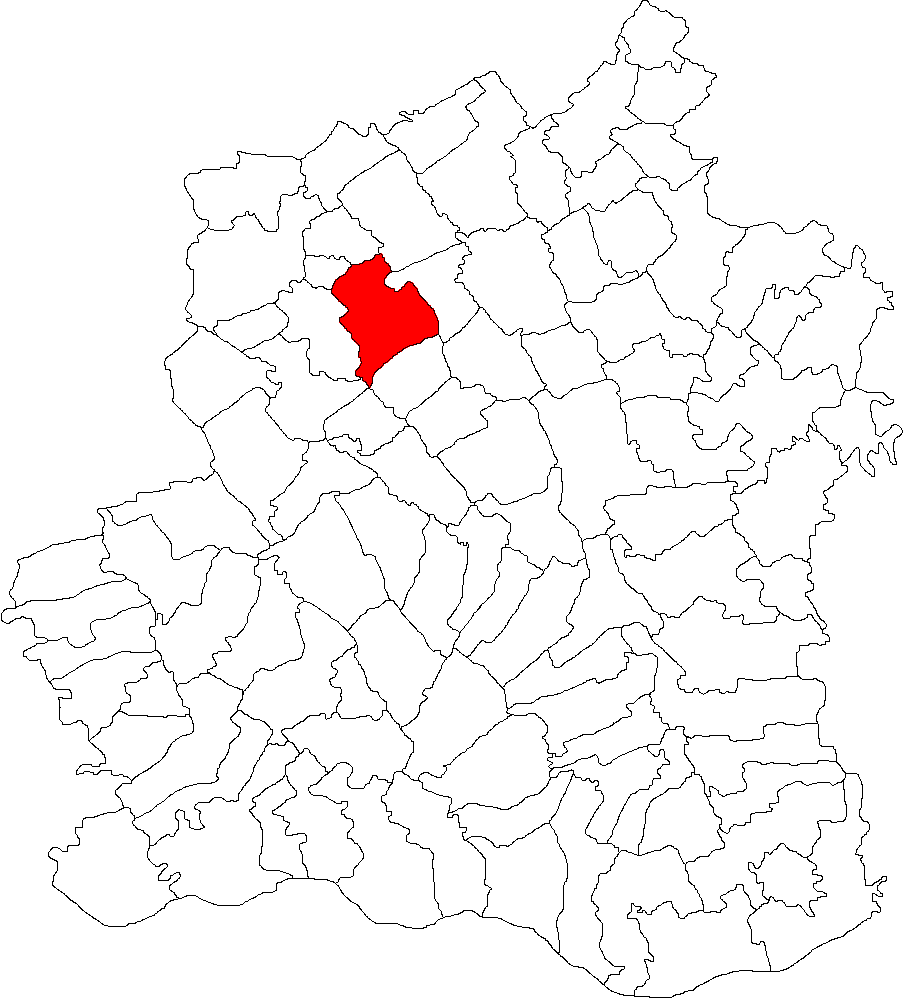
- Location in Teleorman County

- Location in Romania
- Coordinates: 44°14′N 25°04′E
- Country: Romania
- County: Teleorman
- Subdivisions: Butculești, Ciurari, Săceni

Government
  - Mayor (2020–2024): Marin Vișănoiu (PSD)
- Population (2021-12-01): 1,011
- Time zone: EET/EEST (UTC+2/+3)
- Vehicle reg.: TR

Săceni is a commune in Teleorman County, Muntenia, Romania. It is composed of three villages: Butculești, Ciurari and Săceni.
