= Ghimpețeni =

- Commune
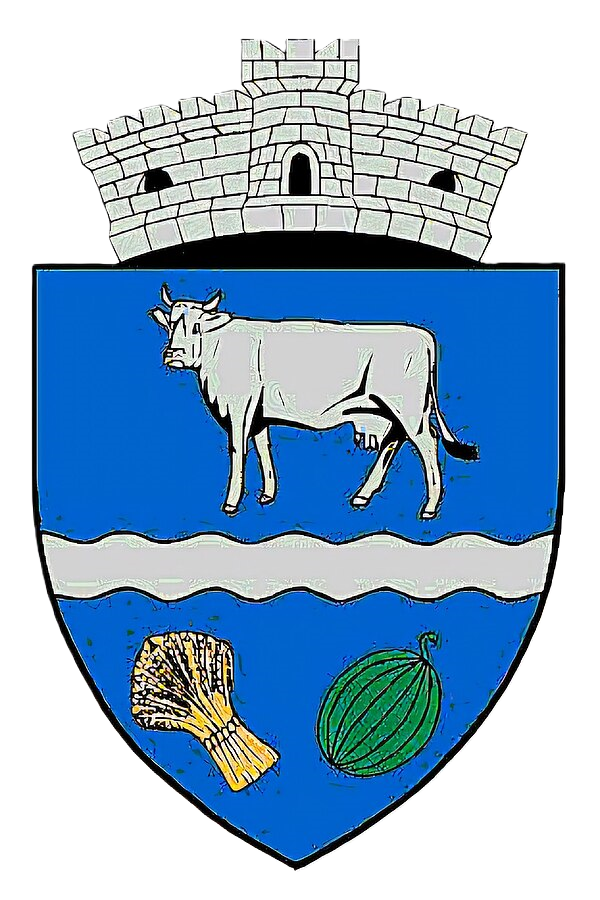
- Coat of arms

- Location in Romania
- Coordinates: 44°17′N 24°46′E
- Country: Romania
- County: Olt
- Population (2021-12-01): 1,294
- Time zone: UTC+02:00 (EET)
  - Summer (DST): UTC+03:00 (EEST)
- Vehicle reg.: OT

Ghimpețeni is a commune in Olt County, Muntenia, Romania. It is composed of two villages, Ghimpețeni and Ghimpețenii Noi. These were part of Nicolae Titulescu Commune until 2004, when they were split off.
