= Tecuci (river) =

- Location within Romania

Location
- Country: Romania
- Counties: Argeș, Teleorman
- Villages: Dobrotești

Physical characteristics
- Mouth: Vedea
  - coordinates: 44.1991°N 24.8896°E
- Length: 61 km (38 mi)
- Basin size: 201 km^{2} (78 sq mi)

Basin features
- Progression: Vedea→ Danube→ Black Sea
- Tributaries
  - left: Bălăcel

The Tecuci is a left tributary of the river Vedea in Romania. It discharges into the Vedea near Didești. Its length is 61 km (38 mi) and its basin size is 201 km^{2} (78 sq mi).
