= Nenciulești, Teleorman =

Nenciulești
- Commune
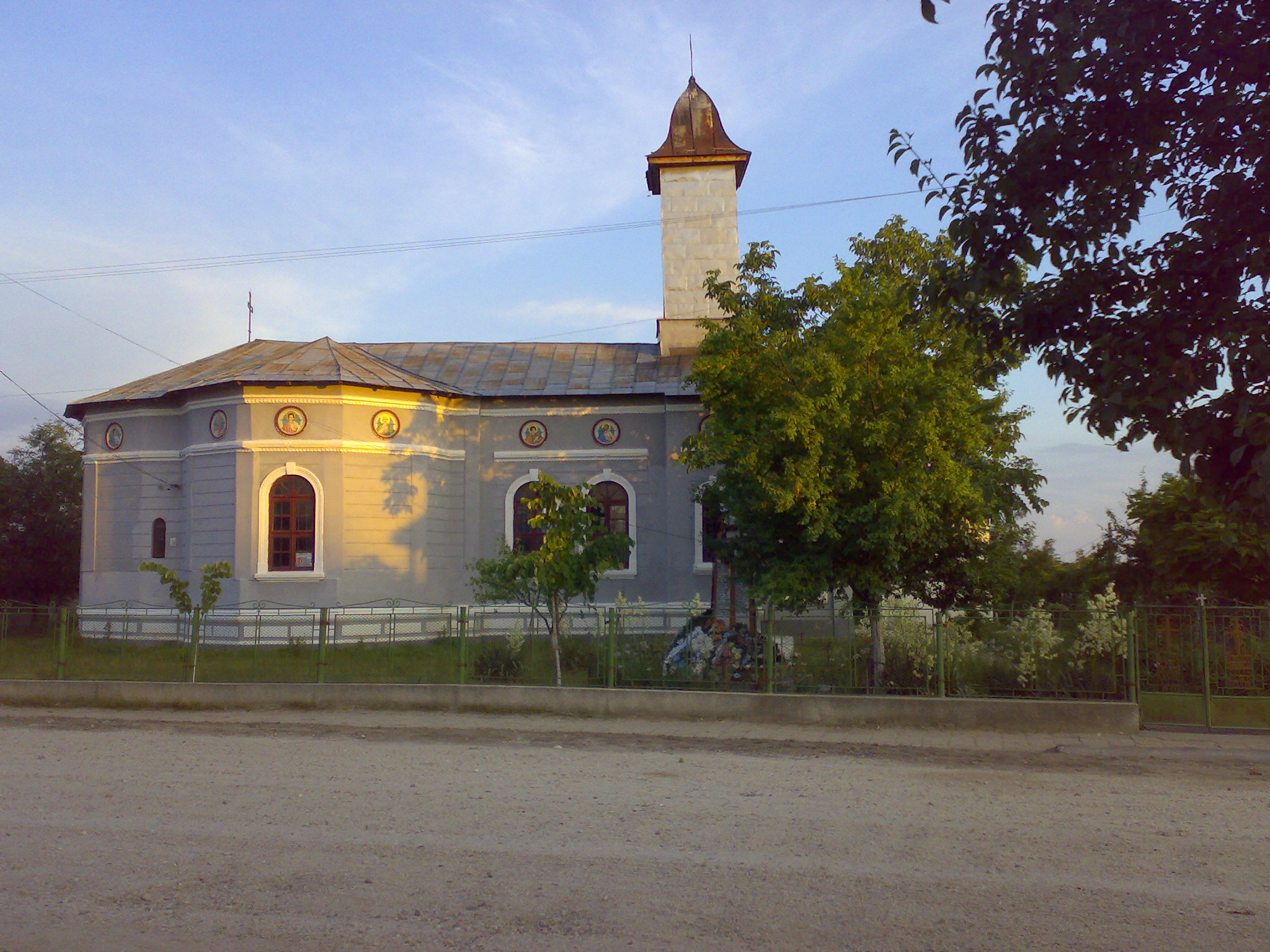
- Church in Nenciulești

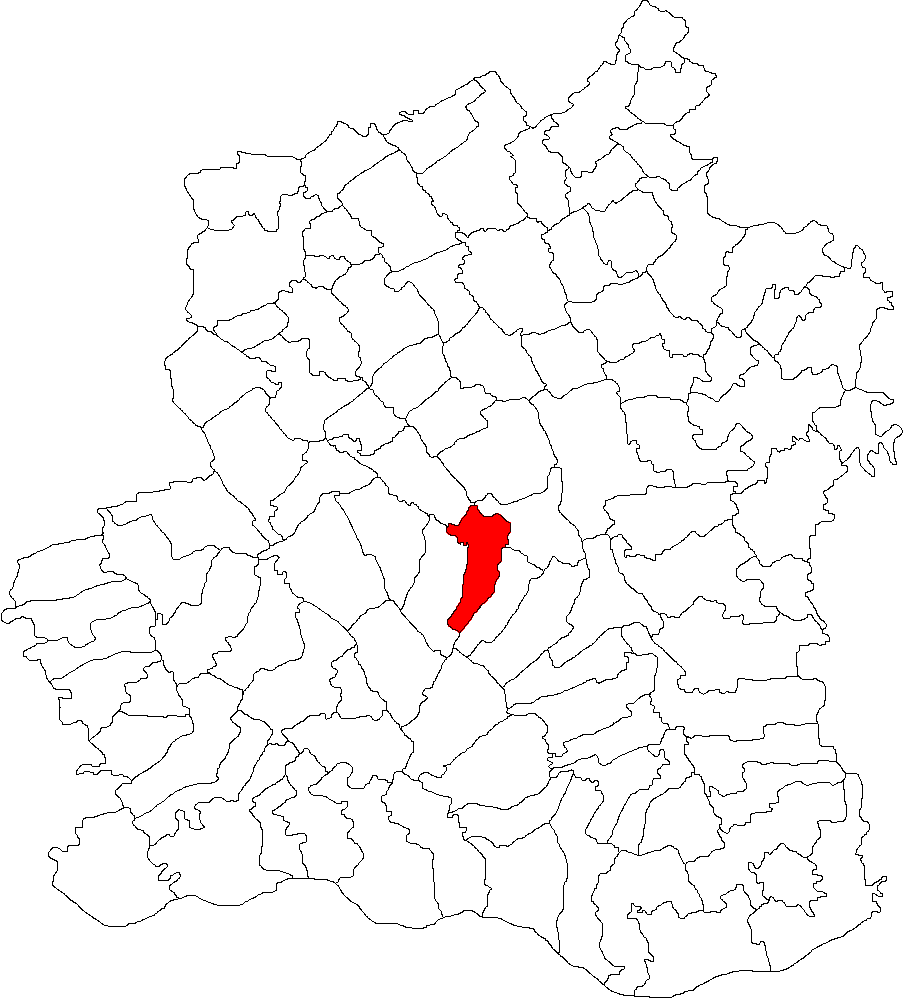
- Location in Teleorman County

- Location in Romania
- Coordinates: 44°02′N 25°11′E
- Country: Romania
- County: Teleorman
- Subdivisions: Nenciulești, Păru Rotund
- Population (2021-12-01): 2,238
- Time zone: UTC+02:00 (EET)
  - Summer (DST): UTC+03:00 (EEST)
- Vehicle reg.: TR

Nenciulești is a commune in Teleorman County, Muntenia, Romania. It is composed of two villages, Nenciulești and Păru Rotund. These were part of Mavrodin Commune until 2003, when they were split off.
