= Movileni, Olt =

Movileni
- Commune
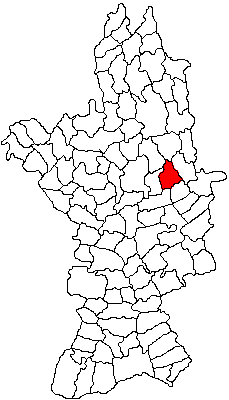
- Location in Olt County

- Location in Romania
- Coordinates: 44°22′N 24°39′E
- Country: Romania
- County: Olt

Government
  - Mayor (2020–2024): Ion Sorin Toma (PSD)
- Area: 50.43 km^{2} (19.47 sq mi)
- Elevation: 146 m (479 ft)
- Population (2021-12-01): 3,137
  - Density: 62/km^{2} (160/sq mi)
- Time zone: EET/EEST (UTC+2/+3)
- Postal code: 237275
- Area code: +(40) 249
- Vehicle reg.: OT
- Website: www.cjolt.ro/ro/primarii/primaria-movileni.html

Movileni is a commune in Olt County, Muntenia, Romania. It is composed of two villages, Bacea and Movileni.

The commune is situated in the Wallachian Plain, at an altitude of 146 m (479 ft), on the banks of the river Dorofei. It is located in the central part of Olt County, 32 km (20 mi) east of the county seat, Slatina.

== Natives ==
- Emanoil Ionescu (1887–1949), a General during World War II and commander of the Royal Romanian Air Force's Corpul I Aerian.
