= Nicolae Titulescu, Olt =

Nicolae Titulescu
- Commune
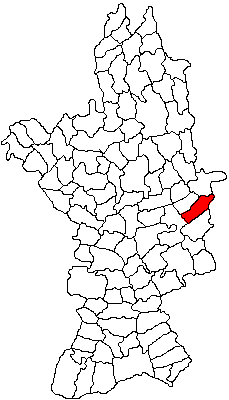
- Location in Olt County

- Location in Romania
- Coordinates: 44°18′N 24°48′E
- Country: Romania
- County: Olt
- Population (2021-12-01): 1,114
- Time zone: EET/EEST (UTC+2/+3)
- Vehicle reg.: OT

Nicolae Titulescu is a commune in Olt County, Muntenia, Romania. It is composed of a single village, Nicolae Titulescu. It also included Ghimpețeni and Ghimpețenii Noi villages until 2004, when they were split off to form Ghimpețeni Commune.

Formerly called Titulești, it was here that Romanian diplomat and politician Nicolae Titulescu grew up on his father's estate.
