= Icoana =

- Commune
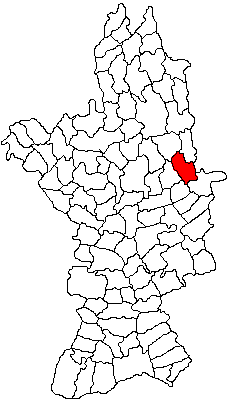
- Location in Olt County

- Location in Romania
- Coordinates: 44°25′N 24°43′E
- Country: Romania
- County: Olt
- Population (2021-12-01): 1,591
- Time zone: EET/EEST (UTC+2/+3)
- Vehicle reg.: OT

Icoana is a commune in Olt County, Muntenia, Romania. It is composed of three villages: Floru, Icoana and Ursoaia.
