= Vedea, Argeș =

Vedea
- Commune
- Location in Romania
- Coordinates: 44.7662°N 24.6401°E
- Country: Romania
- County: Argeș
- Population (2021-12-01): 3,459
- Time zone: UTC+02:00 (EET)
  - Summer (DST): UTC+03:00 (EEST)
- Vehicle reg.: AG

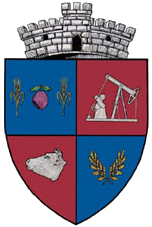
Coat of arms of Vedea, Romania

Vedea is a commune in Argeș County, Muntenia, Romania. It is composed of nineteen villages: Bădicea, Blejani, Burețești, Chirițești, Chițani, Ciurești, Dincani, Fata, Frătici, Izvoru de Jos, Izvoru de Sus, Lungani, Mogoșești, Prodani, Rățoi, Vața, Vârșești, Vedea and Vețișoara.
