= Bujoru, Teleorman =

Bujoru
- Commune
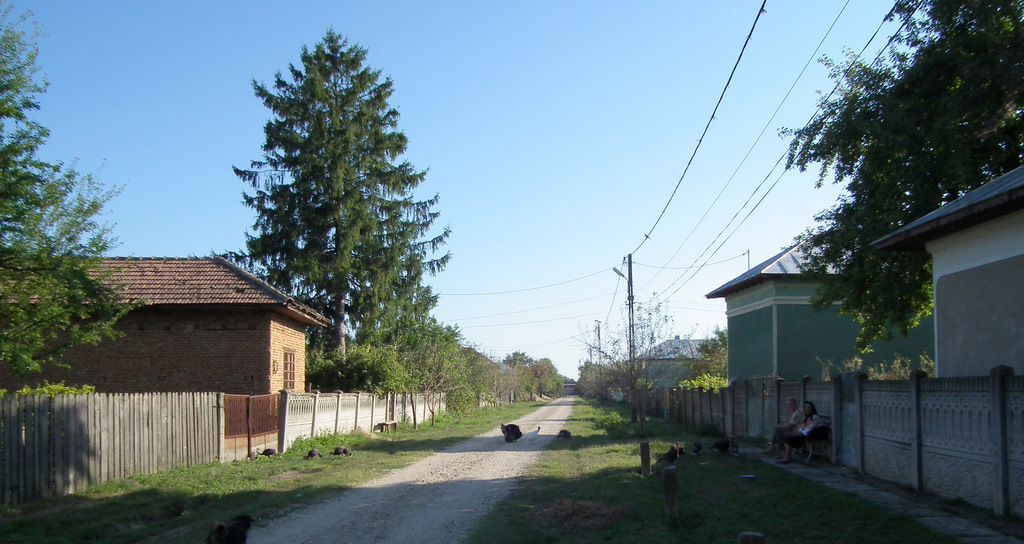
- Dogaru Street, Bujoru

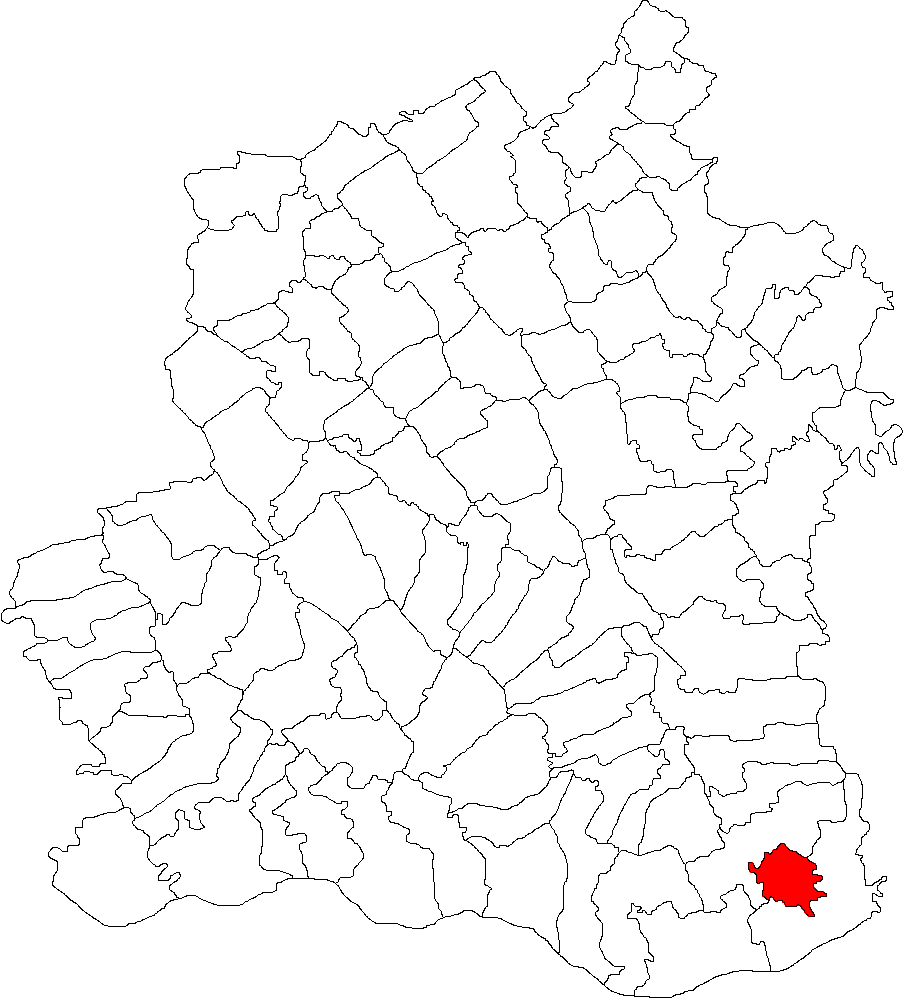
- Location in Teleorman County

- Location in Romania
- Coordinates: 43°43′N 25°34′E
- Country: Romania
- County: Teleorman
- Population (2021-12-01): 1,706
- Time zone: UTC+02:00 (EET)
  - Summer (DST): UTC+03:00 (EEST)
- Vehicle reg.: TR

Bujoru (Romanian pronunciation: [buˈʒoru]) is a commune in Teleorman County, Muntenia, Romania. It is composed of a single village, Bujoru.
