= Vedea, Teleorman =

Vedea
- Commune
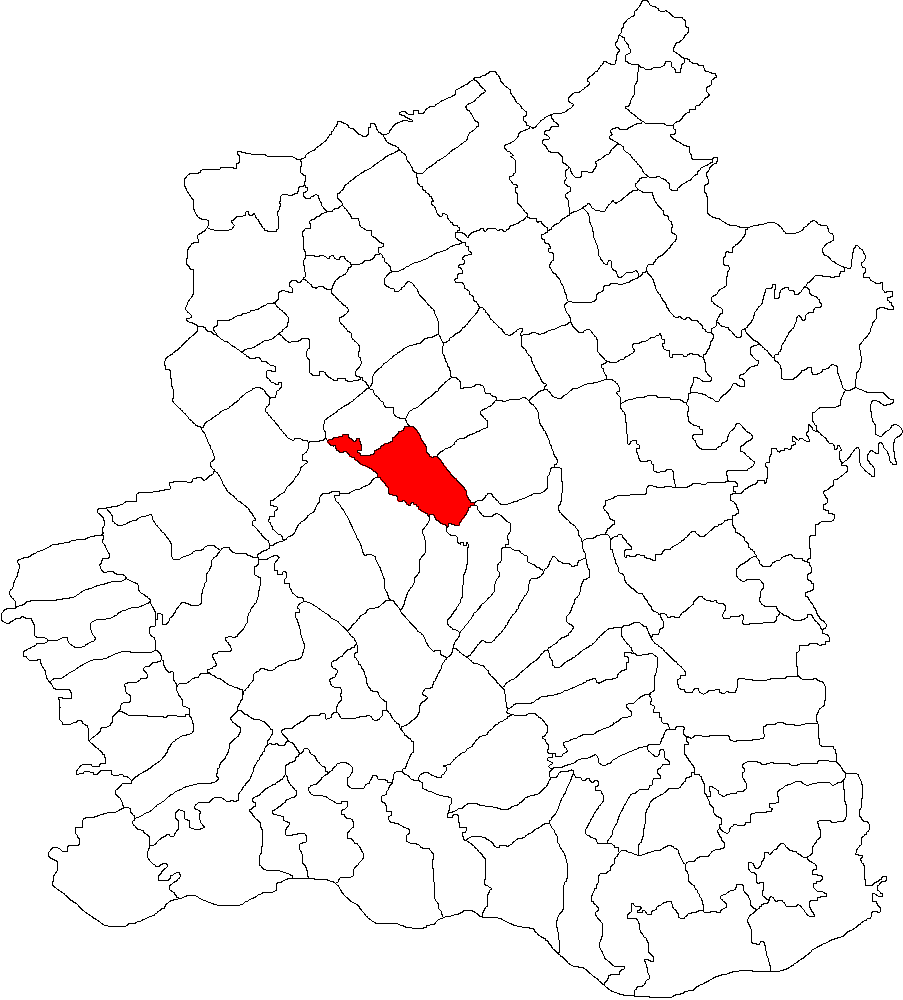
- Location in Teleorman County

- Location in Romania
- Coordinates: 44°05′N 25°04′E
- Country: Romania
- County: Teleorman
- Subdivisions: Albești, Coșoteni, Dulceanca, Meri, Vedea

Government
  - Mayor (2020–2024): Aurel Drăghici (PSD)
- Area: 54 km^{2} (21 sq mi)
- Elevation: 97 m (318 ft)
- Population (2021-12-01): 2,557
  - Density: 47/km^{2} (120/sq mi)
- Time zone: EET/EEST (UTC+2/+3)
- Postal code: 147430
- Area code: +(40) x47
- Vehicle reg.: TR
- Website: www.primariavedea.ro

Vedea is a commune in Teleorman County, Muntenia, Romania. It is composed of five villages: Albești, Coșoteni, Dulceanca, Meri, and Vedea.
