= Spineni =

- Commune
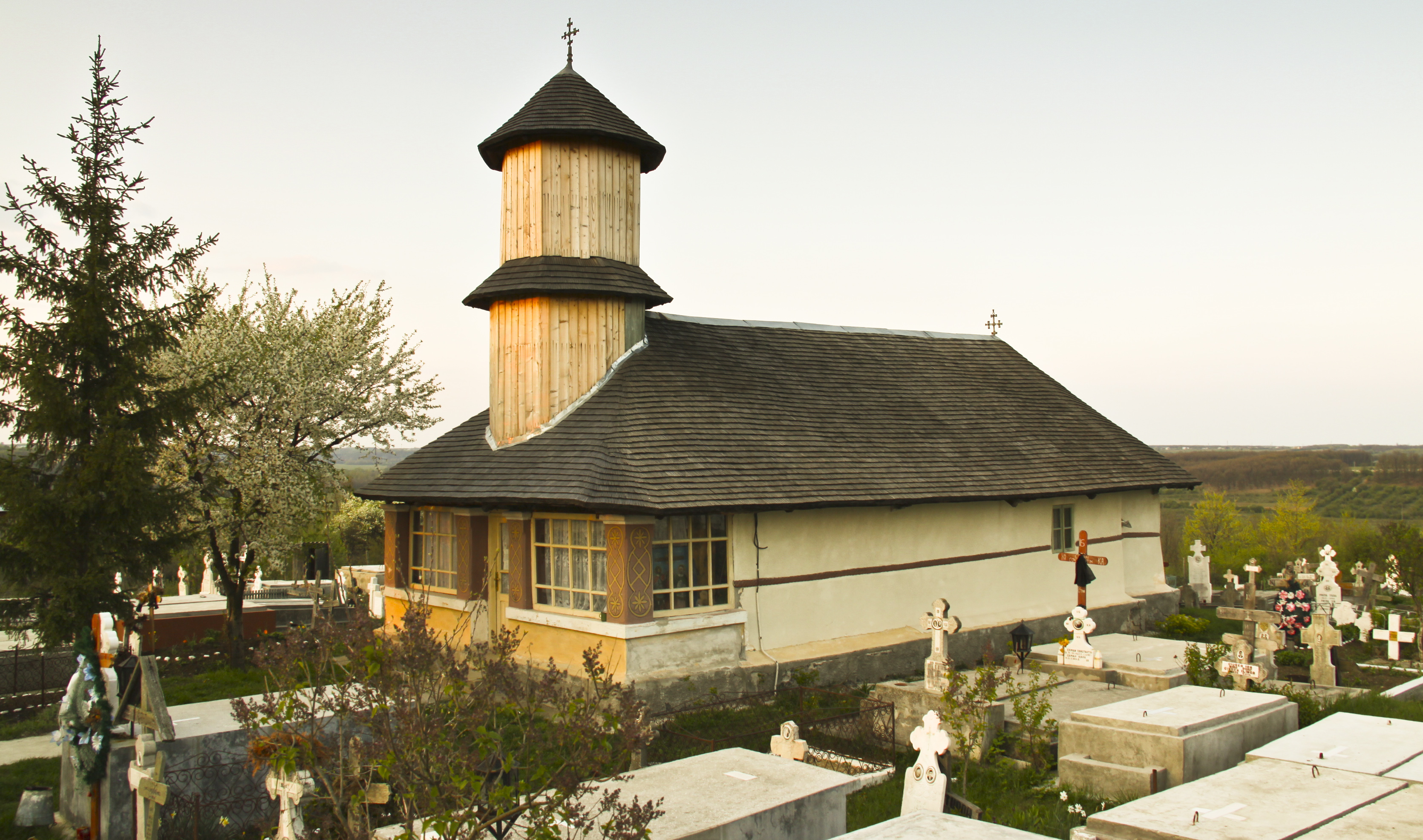
- Wooden church in Alunișu

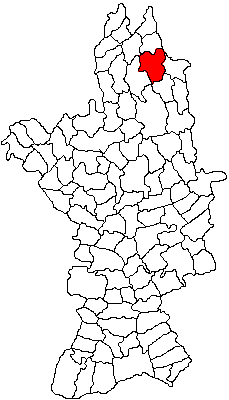
- Location in Olt County

- Location in Romania
- Coordinates: 44°45′N 24°33′E
- Country: Romania
- County: Olt

Government
  - Mayor (2020–2024): Dănuț Șărpău (PSD)
- Area: 73.98 km^{2} (28.56 sq mi)
- Elevation: 325 m (1,066 ft)
- Population (2021-12-01): 1,791
  - Density: 24.21/km^{2} (62.70/sq mi)
- Time zone: UTC+02:00 (EET)
  - Summer (DST): UTC+03:00 (EEST)
- Postal code: 237415
- Area code: +(40) 249
- Vehicle reg.: OT
- Website: www.primariaspineni.ro

Spineni is a commune in Olt County, Muntenia, Romania. It is composed of seven villages: Alunișu, Cuza Vodă, Davidești, Optășani, Profa, Spineni, and Vineți.

== Natives ==
- Ion Iovescu (1912–1977), prose writer
