= Mavrodin =

- Commune
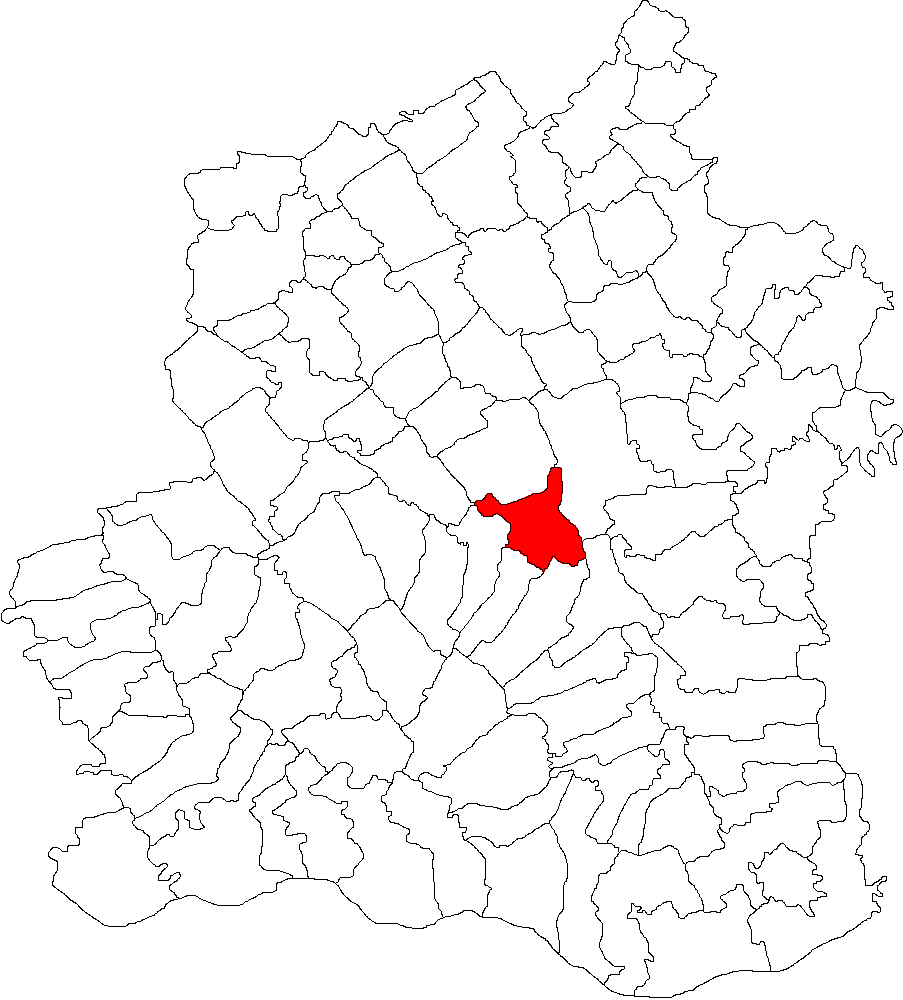
- Location in Teleorman County

- Location in Romania
- Coordinates: 44°02′N 25°15′E
- Country: Romania
- County: Teleorman

Government
  - Mayor (2024–2028): Nicolae Stan (PNL)
- Elevation: 57 m (187 ft)
- Population (2021-12-01): 2,316
- Time zone: UTC+02:00 (EET)
  - Summer (DST): UTC+03:00 (EEST)
- Postal code: 147185
- Area code: +(40) 247
- Vehicle reg.: TR
- Website: www.primariamavrodin.ro

Mavrodin is a commune in Teleorman County, Muntenia, Romania. It is composed of a single village, Mavrodin. It also included two other villages until 2003, when they were split off to form Nenciulești Commune.
