= Uda, Argeș =

Uda
- Commune
- Location in Romania
- Coordinates: 44.8767°N 24.5882°E
- Country: Romania
- County: Argeș
- Population (2021-12-01): 1,700
- Time zone: UTC+02:00 (EET)
  - Summer (DST): UTC+03:00 (EEST)
- Vehicle reg.: AG

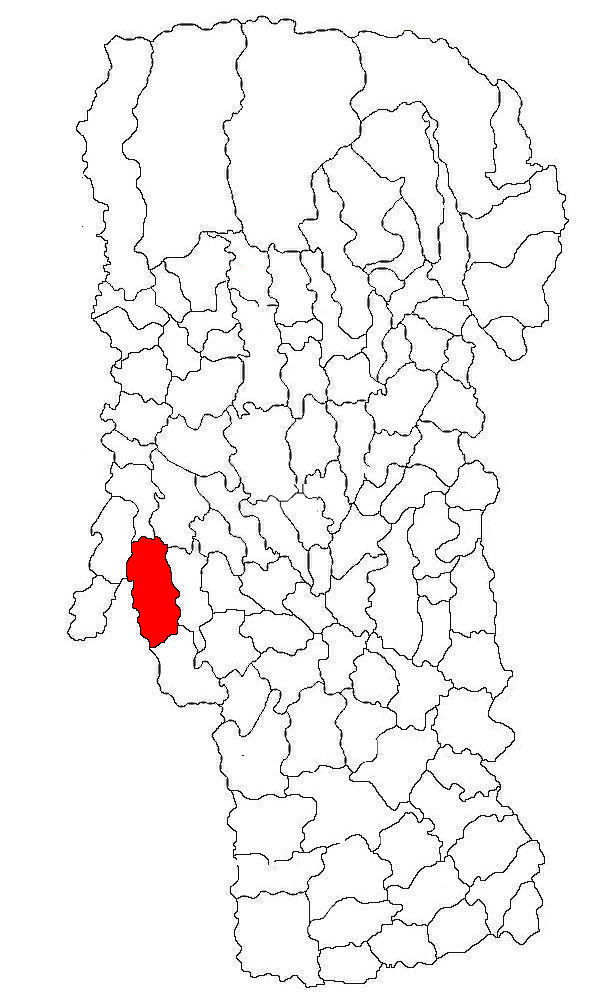
Location of Uda within Arges County, Romania

Uda is a commune in Argeș County, Muntenia, Romania. It is composed of sixteen villages: Bădulești, Bărănești, Braniștea, Chirițești, Cotu, Dealu Bisericii, Dealu Tolcesii, Diconești, Gorani, Greabăn, Lungulești, Miercani, Râjlețu-Govora, Romana, Săliștea and Uda.
