= Alexandria, Romania =

Alexandria
- Municipality
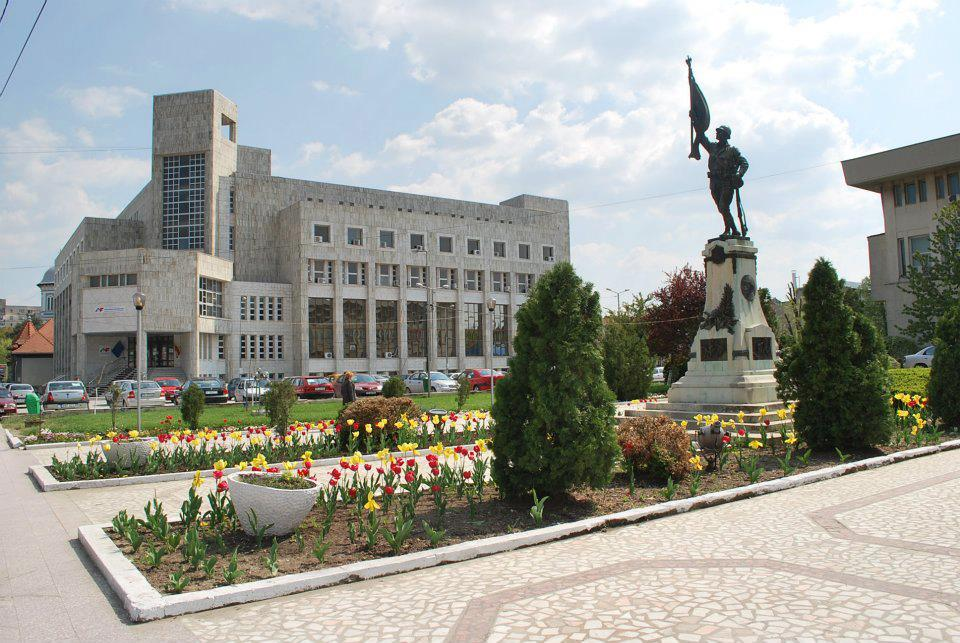
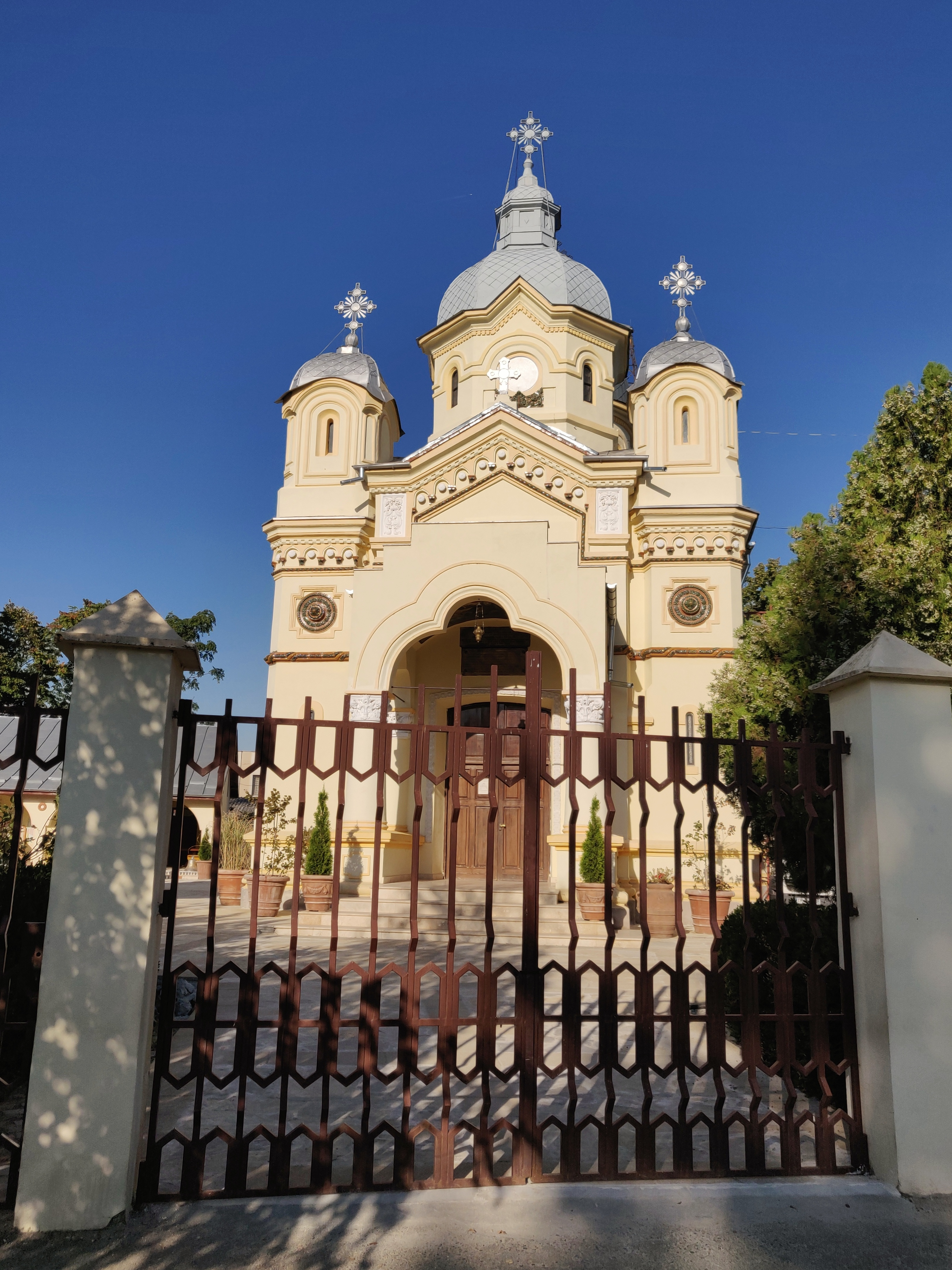
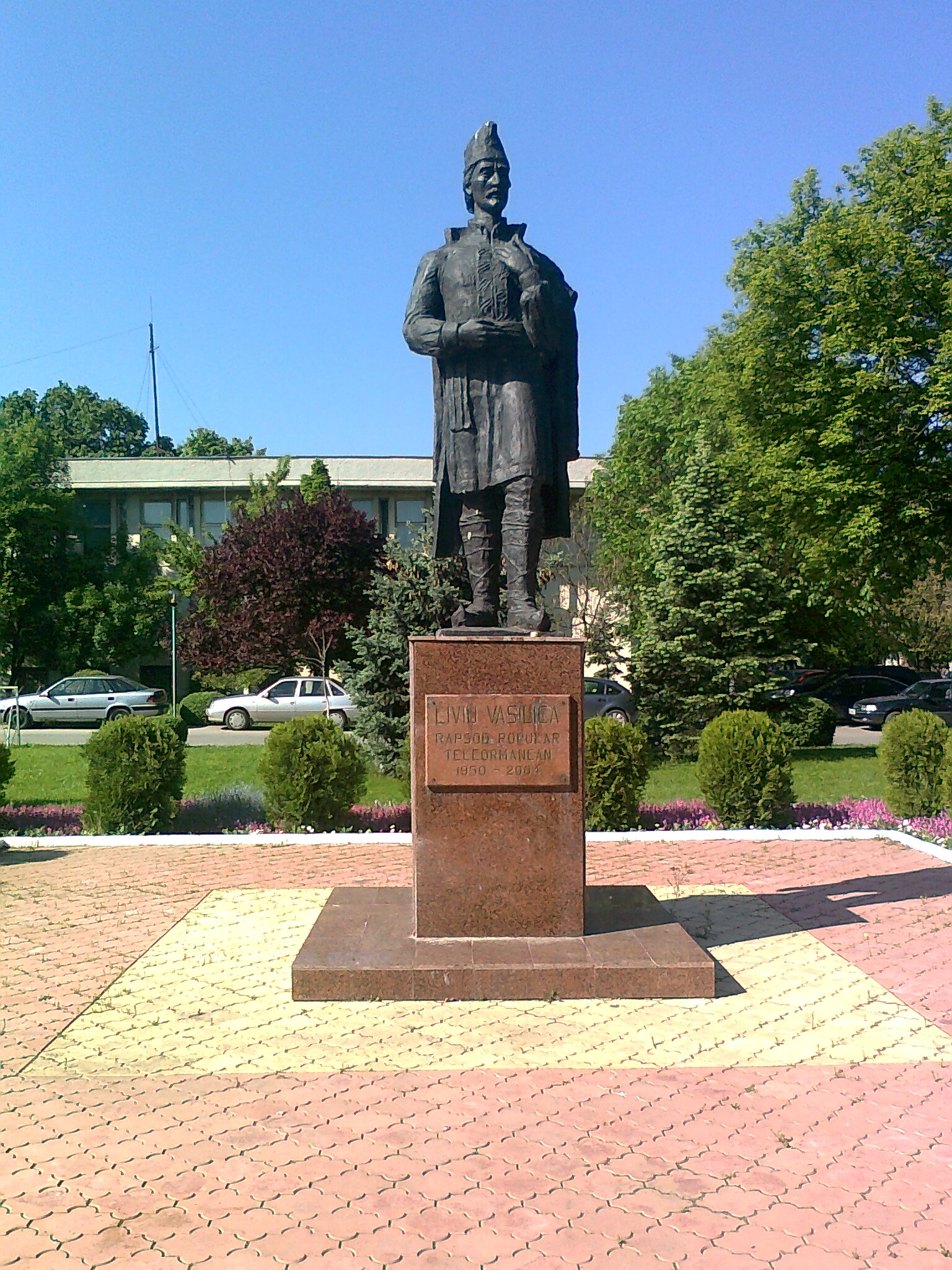
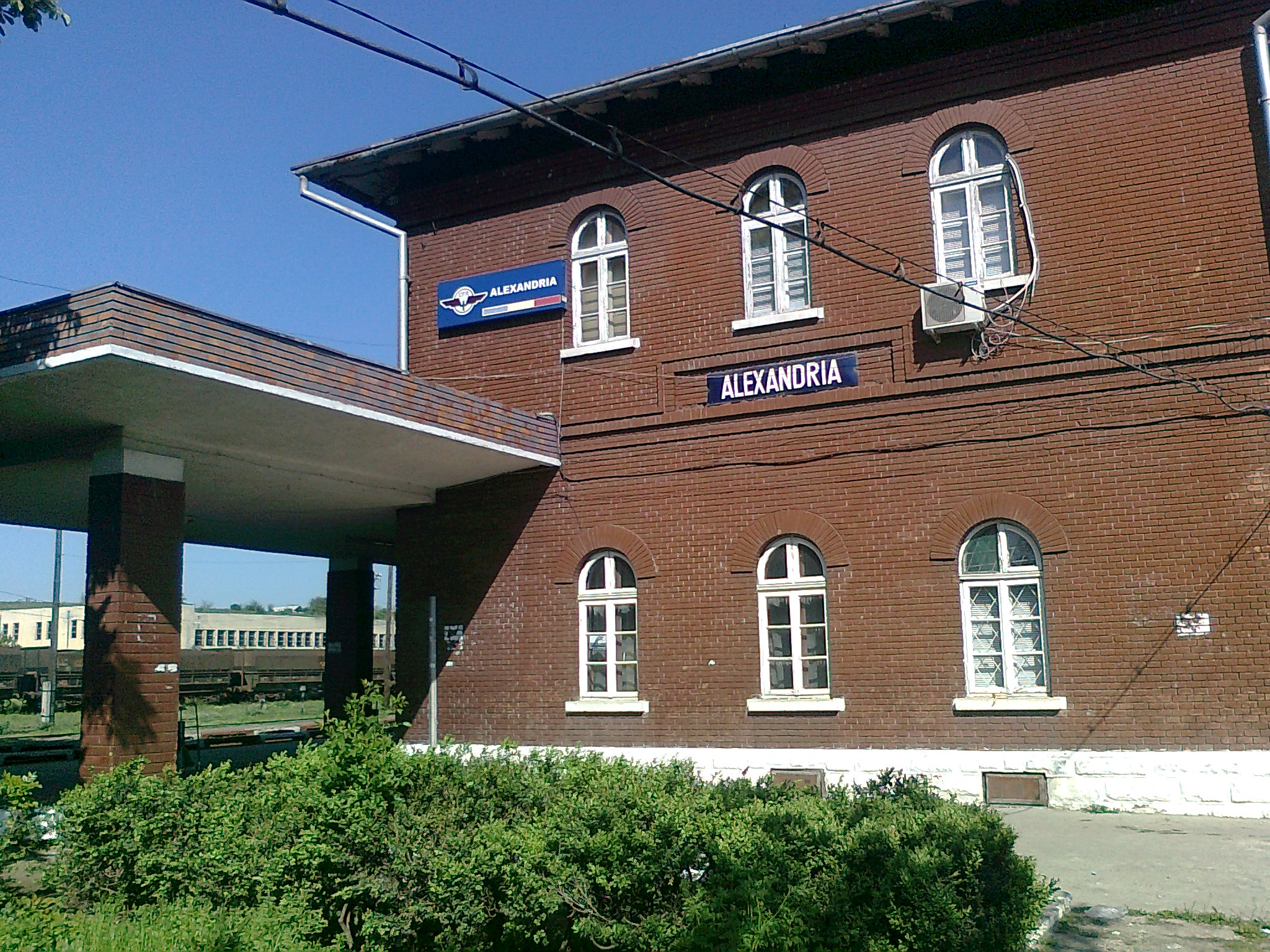
- Teleorman County prefecture Holy Apostles Church Statue of Liviu Vasilică Train station

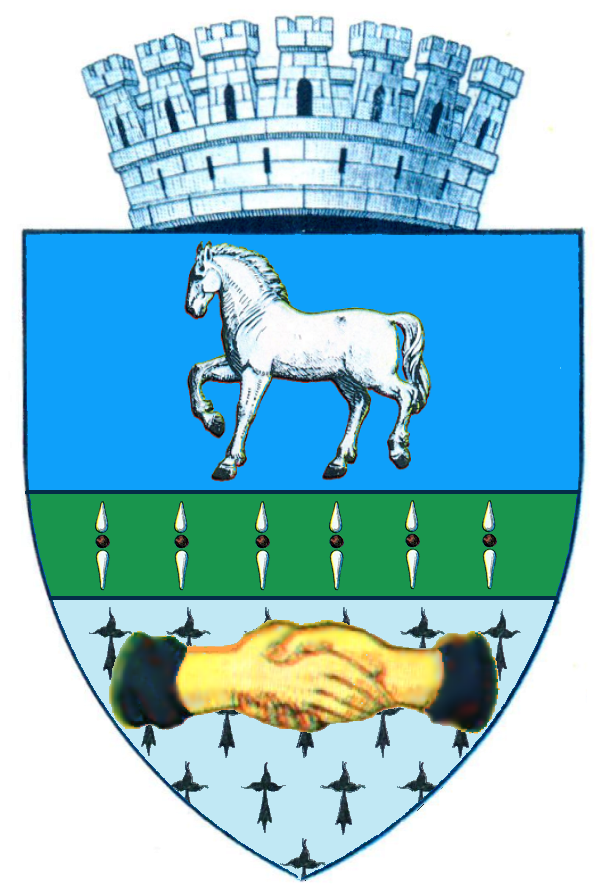
- Coat of arms

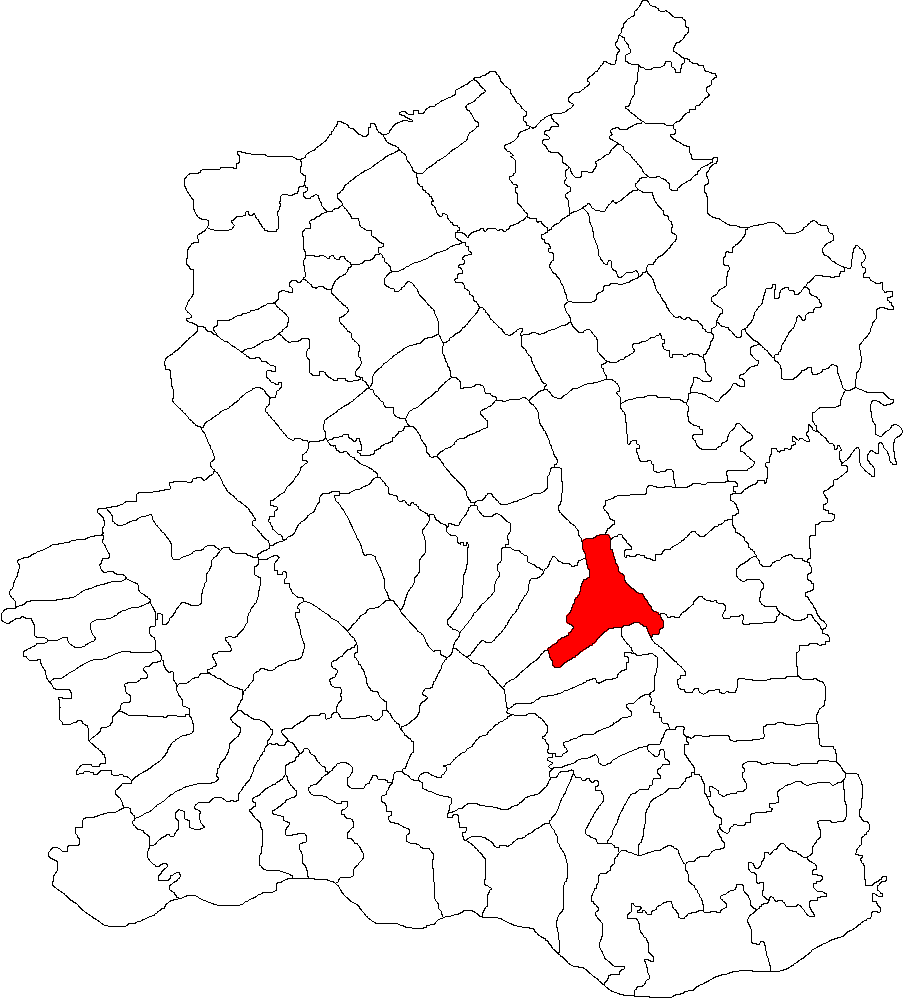
- Location in Teleorman County

- Location in Romania
- Coordinates: 43°58′7″N 25°20′0″E
- Country: Romania
- County: Teleorman

Government
  - Mayor (2024–2028): Victor Drăgusin (PSD)
- Area: 9.56 km^{2} (3.69 sq mi)
- Elevation: 47 m (154 ft)
- Population (2021-12-01): 40,390
  - Density: 4,220/km^{2} (10,900/sq mi)
- Time zone: UTC+02:00 (EET)
  - Summer (DST): UTC+03:00 (EEST)
- Postal code: 140001–140113
- Vehicle reg.: TR
- Website: www.alexandria.ro

Alexandria (Romanian pronunciation: [alekˈsandri.a]) is the capital city of the Teleorman County, Muntenia, Romania. It is located south-west of Bucharest, towards the Bulgarian border, and has over 40,000 inhabitants. The 44th parallel north passes just north of the city.

== Geography ==
Alexandria is situated in the middle of the Wallachian Plain, on the banks of the Vedea River. It is located in the central part of Teleorman County, at a distance of 62 km (39 mi) from Giurgiu and 86 km (53 mi) from Bucharest.

The city is traversed by the national road DN6, which links Bucharest to the Banat region in western Romania; the road is part of European route E70. The Alexandria train station serves the CFR Line 909, with service towards Roșiorii de Vede (to the northwest) and Zimnicea (to the south, on the Danube).

Climate data for Alexandria, Romania
Month	Jan	Feb	Mar	Apr	May	Jun	Jul	Aug	Sep	Oct	Nov	Dec	Year
Mean daily maximum °C (°F)	2.3 (36.1)	5.3 (41.5)	12.1 (53.8)	18.3 (64.9)	23.0 (73.4)	27.5 (81.5)	29.8 (85.6)	31.1 (88.0)	25.7 (78.3)	17.6 (63.7)	11.9 (53.4)	4.8 (40.6)	17.5 (63.4)
Mean daily minimum °C (°F)	−3.3 (26.1)	−0.8 (30.6)	4.0 (39.2)	7.6 (45.7)	11.9 (53.4)	15.9 (60.6)	17.8 (64.0)	18.8 (65.8)	15.2 (59.4)	9.9 (49.8)	5.6 (42.1)	−0.5 (31.1)	8.5 (47.3)
Average precipitation mm (inches)	55.7 (2.19)	38.6 (1.52)	54.1 (2.13)	57.3 (2.26)	71.6 (2.82)	106.5 (4.19)	70.9 (2.79)	40.2 (1.58)	34.9 (1.37)	58.7 (2.31)	39.8 (1.57)	47.4 (1.87)	675.7 (26.6)
Average snowfall cm (inches)	6.5 (2.6)	6.8 (2.7)	2.9 (1.1)	0 (0)	0 (0)	0 (0)	0 (0)	0 (0)	0 (0)	0 (0)	0.8 (0.3)	4.7 (1.9)	21.7 (8.6)
Average precipitation days (≥ 0.1 mm)	10.1	9.3	11.8	9.9	12.2	11.8	7.6	5.5	6.1	8	11.3	9.2	112.8
Average snowy days	6.7	4.1	3.1	0	0	0	0	0	0	0.8	1.5	3.7	19.9
Average relative humidity (%)	85	82	70	64	67	64	58	49	52	65	74	80	68
Mean daily daylight hours	9.3	10.5	12	13.5	14.8	15.4	15.1	14	12.5	11	9.7	9	12.2
Average ultraviolet index	1	2	4	4	5	6	6	6	5	3	2	2	4
Source: Weather Atlas, World Weather Online (precipitation, UV 2009–2023), Meteomanz (precipitation days, snow days 2014–2023)

== History ==
Alexandria was named after its founder, Alexandru D. Ghica, Prince of Wallachia from April 1834 to 7 October 1842. Its population in 1900 was 1,675. Grain, which was Alexandria's main trade at the time, was dispatched both by rail to the Danubian port of Zimnicea and by river to Giurgiu.

In 1989, the city had over 63,000 inhabitants and more than six large factories. The 2021 census puts the population at 40,390.

On March 28th 2026, a tornado east of Alexandria touched down, damaging powerlines, roofs, cars, and snapping trees and tree branches. This tornado ended up being given an IF1.5 rating.

Historical population
Year	Pop.	±%
1912	15,785	—
1930	19,350	+22.6%
1948	17,840	−7.8%
1956	19,294	+8.2%
1966	21,898	+13.5%
1977	37,340	+70.5%
1992	58,478	+56.6%
2002	50,591	−13.5%
2011	45,434	−10.2%
2021	40,390	−11.1%
Source: Census data

== Education ==
There are four high schools in Alexandria: the Alexandru D. Ghica National College, the Alexandru Ioan Cuza Theoretical High School, the Mircea Scarlat National Pedagogical College and the Constantin Noica Theoretical High School.

In 1897, the Ștefan cel Mare School moved from its former location to 310 Libertății Street; a local entrepreneur, M. Frangulea, obtained the plot and hired renowned architect Alexandru Săvulescu to build the new boys' primary school for the city.

== Religion ==
The Diocese of Alexandria and Teleorman is a diocese of the Romanian Orthodox Church. Its see is Saint Alexander Cathedral in Alexandria and its ecclesiastical territory covers Teleorman County.

== Sports ==
CSM Alexandria is a football club founded in 1948; it plays in the Romanian Liga III. CS Universitatea Alexandria is a women's football club founded in 2012. Stadionul Municipal, which holds 5,000 people, is the home ground for both clubs; the stadium is currently undergoing reconstruction. The Alexandria women's basketball team plays in the Liga Națională.

== Natives ==
- Valentin Badea (b. 1982), footballer
- Dan Balauru (b. 1980), footballer
- Adrian Bădulescu (b. 1967), politician
- Cătălin Botezatu (b. 1966), fashion creator
- Alexandru Colfescu (1899–1976), mayor, lawyer, writer
- Anghel Demetriescu (1847–1903), historian
- Gheorghe Mihăilescu (1888–?), World War I pilot
- Ciprian Manolescu (b. 1978), mathematician
- Andreea Ogrăzeanu (b. 1990), sprinter
- Florin Olteanu (b. 1981), footballer
- Sorin Paraschiv (b. 1981), footballer
- Alin Pencea (b. 1992), footballer
- Marin Stan (b. 1950), sports shooter
- Alina Tecșor (b. 1979), tennis player
- Alin Toșca (b. 1992), footballer
- Daniel Tudor (b. 1974), footballer
- Mihai Verbițchi (b. 1957), actor
- Ionuț Voicu (b. 1984), footballer

== Gallery ==
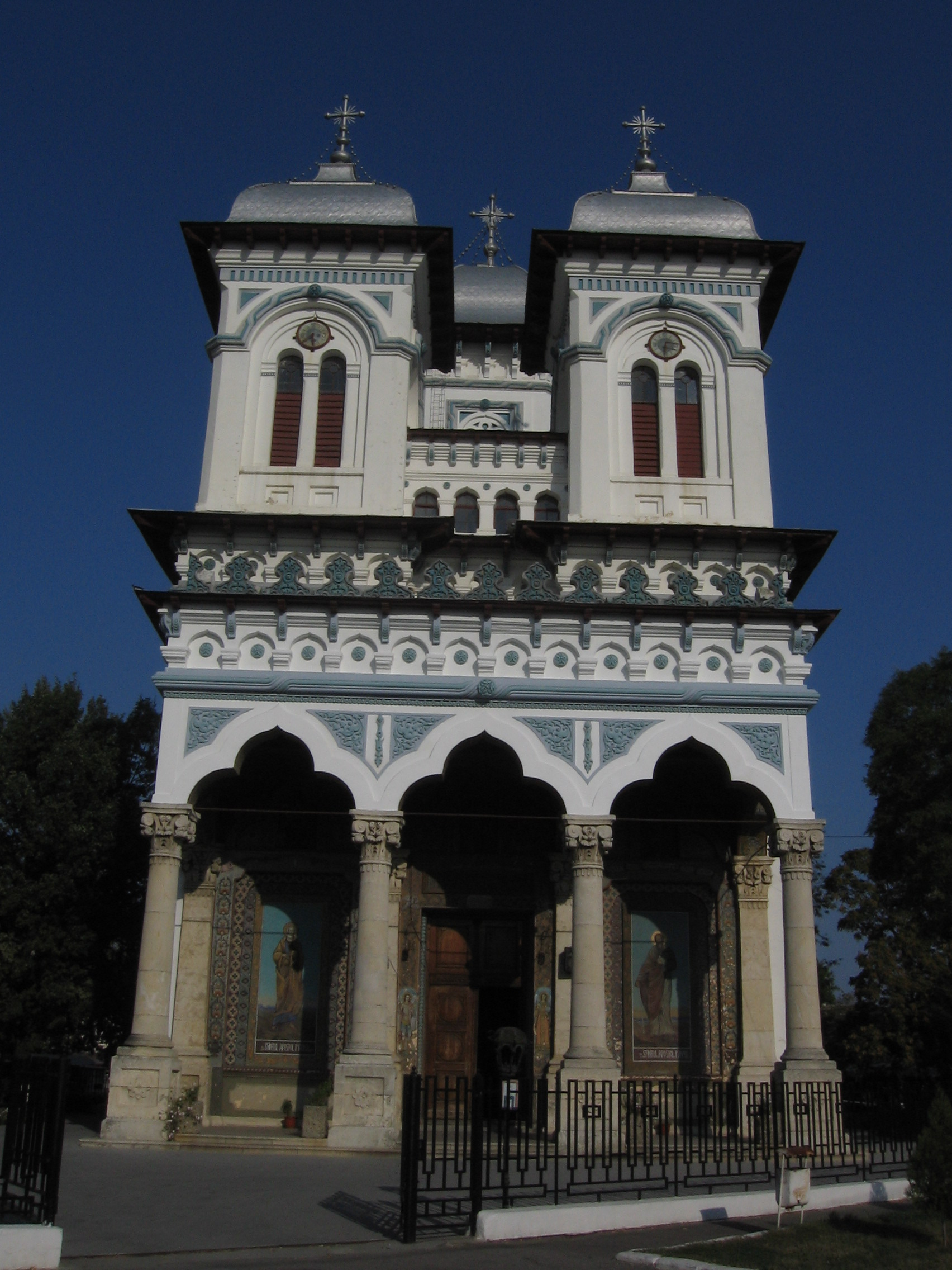
Saint Alexander Cathedral

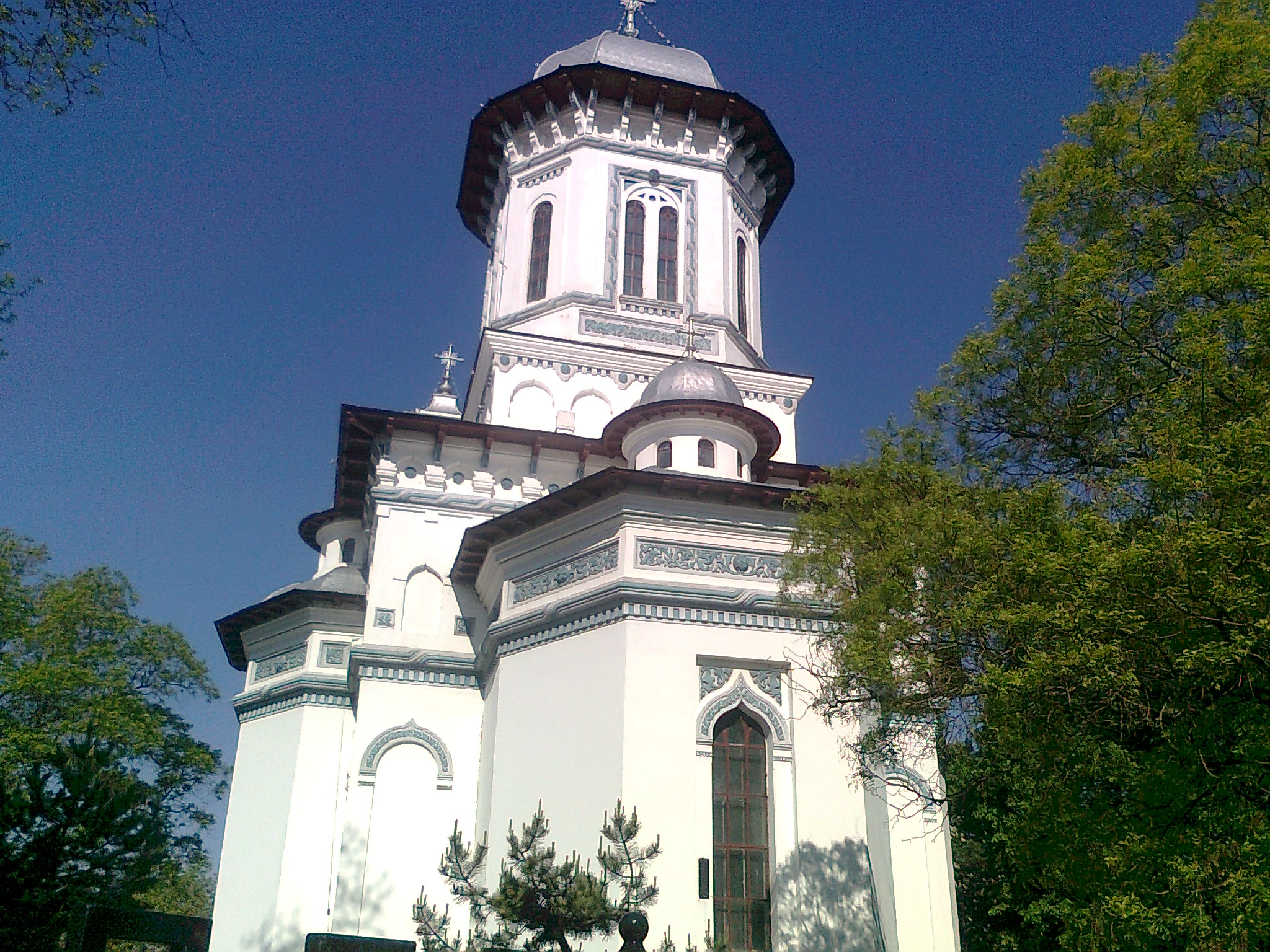
Orthodox church

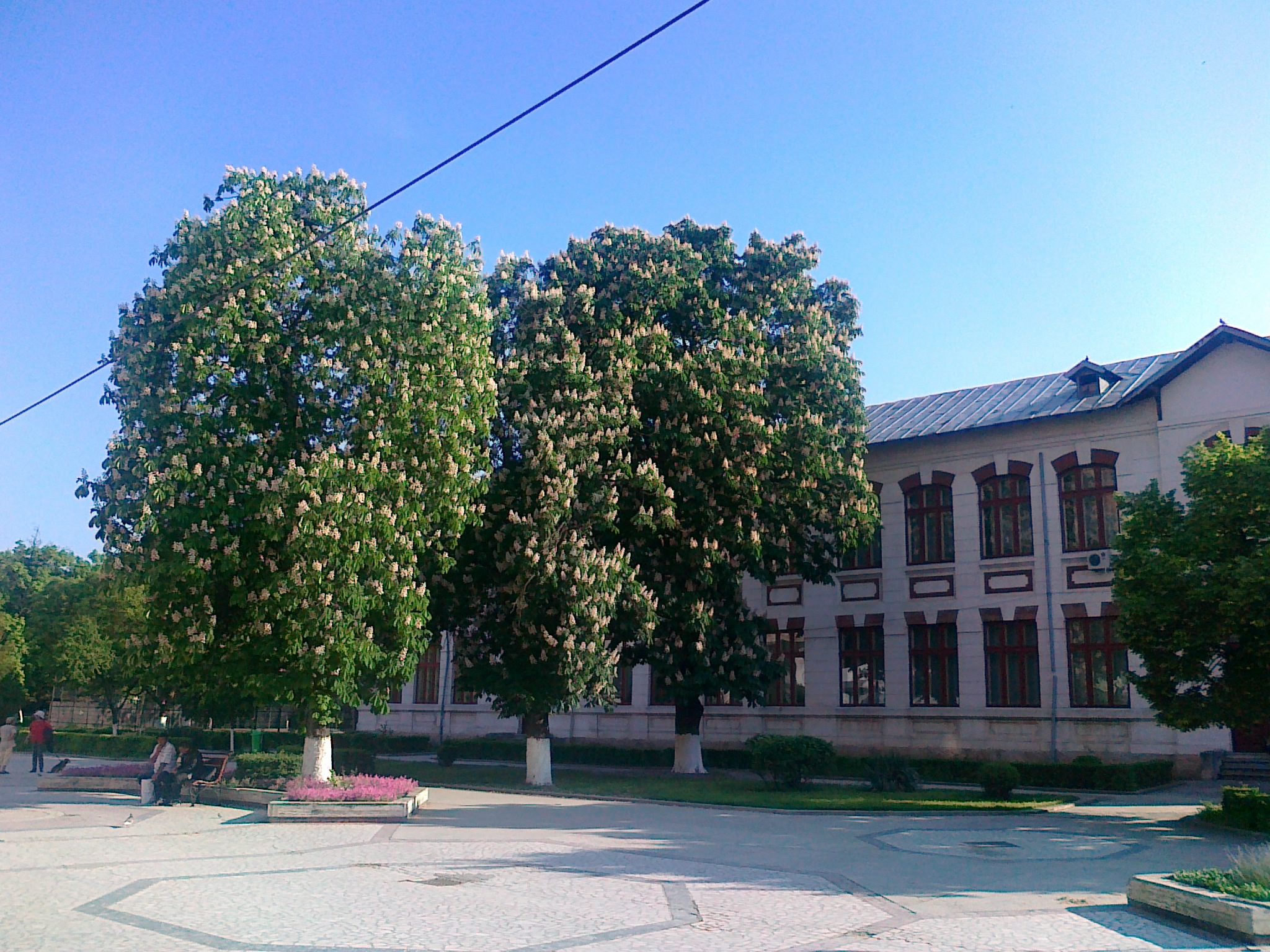
School Nr. 5, dating from 1895
