= Baboia =

Baboia Eruga
- Location within Romania

Location
- Country: Romania
- Counties: Dolj County

Physical characteristics
- Mouth: Desnățui
  - location: Goicea
  - coordinates: 43.9490°N 23.6000°E
- Length: 80 km (50 mi)
- Basin size: 609 km^{2} (235 sq mi)

Basin features
- Progression: Desnățui→ Danube→ Black Sea
- Tributaries
  - left: Teiul

The Baboia (also: Eruga) is a right tributary of the river Desnățui in Romania. It discharges into the Desnățui near Goicea. It flows through the villages Verbița, Orodel, Vârtop, Caraula, Galicea Mare, Siliștea Crucii and Afumați. Its length is 80 km (50 mi) and its basin size is 609 km^{2} (235 sq mi).
