= Brabova (river) =

- Location within Romania

Location
- Country: Romania
- Counties: Dolj County
- Villages: Veleni, Brabova, Pietroaia, Sârsca

Physical characteristics
- Mouth: Merețel
  - coordinates: 44.3758°N 23.5701°E
- Length: 32 km (20 mi)
- Basin size: 130 km^{2} (50 sq mi)

Basin features
- Progression: Merețel→ Raznic→ Jiu→ Danube→ Black Sea
- Tributaries
  - left: Urdinița
  - right: Răchita

The Brabova is a right tributary of the river Merețel in Romania. It discharges into the Merețel near Sârsca. Its length is 32 km (20 mi) and its basin size is 130 km^{2} (50 sq mi).
