= Craiova metropolitan area =

- Metropolitan area
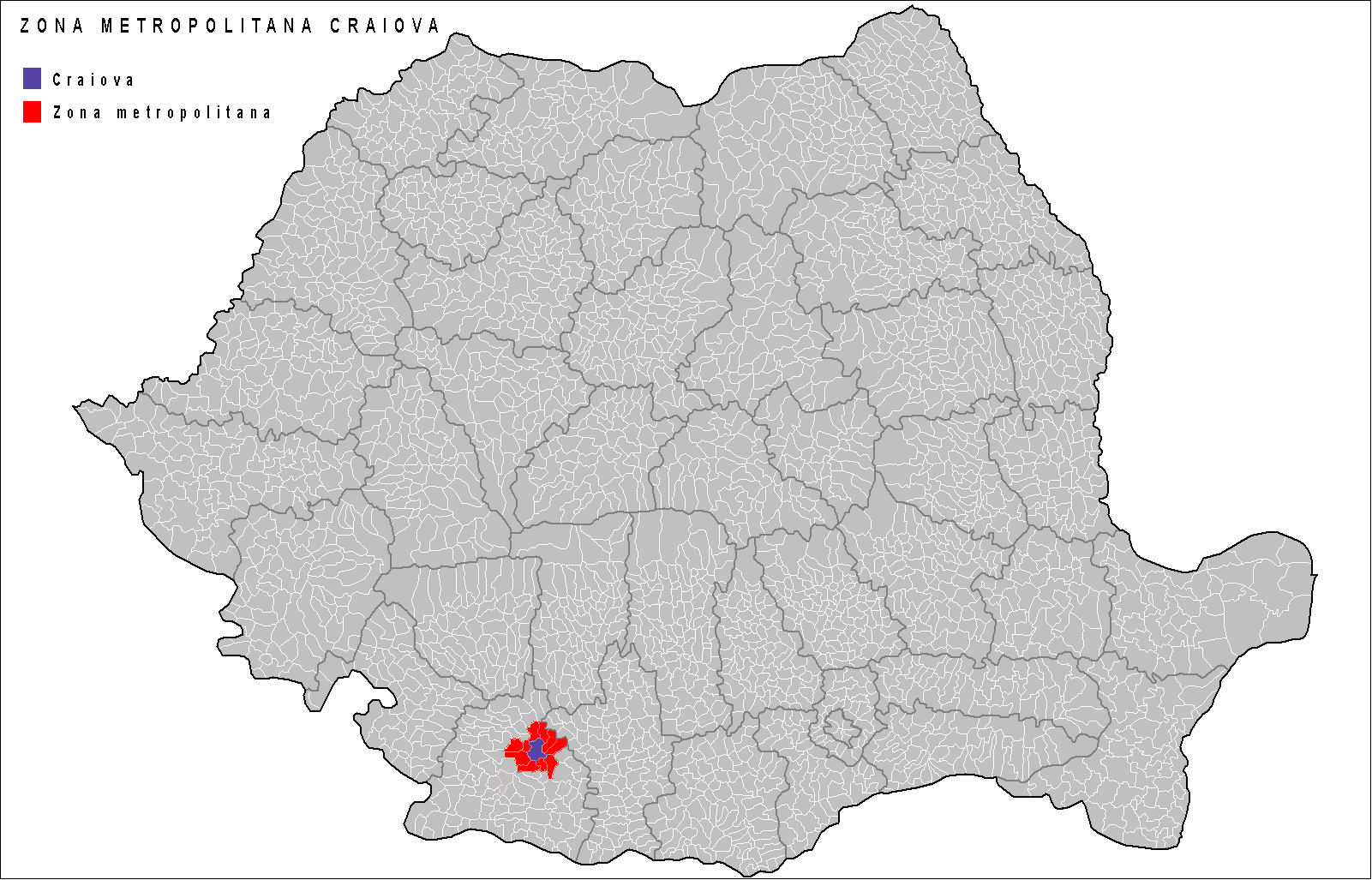
- Country: Romania
- County: Dolj
- Central Municipality: Craiova
- Other cities: Filiași, Segarcea
- Other localities: Almăj, Brădești, Breasta, Bucovăț, Calopăr, Cârcea, Coșoveni, Coțofenii din Față, Ghercești, Ișalnița, Malu Mare, Mischii, Murgași, Pielești, Predești, Șimnicu de Sus, Teasc, Terpezița, Țuglui, Vârvoru de Jos, Vela
- Functional: 2009

Area
  - Total: 1,498.6 km^{2} (578.6 sq mi)

Population (2011 census)
  - Total: 356,544
  - Density: 238/km^{2} (620/sq mi)
- Time zone: UTC+2 (EET)
  - Summer (DST): UTC+3 (EEST)
- Postal Code: ??wxyz^{1}
- Area code: + x??^{2}
- ^{1}w, x, y, and z are digits that indicate the street, part of the street, or even the building of the address^{2}x is a digit indicating the operator: 2 for the former national operator, Romtelecom, and 3 for the other ground telephone networks

Craiova metropolitan area is a metropolitan area, founded on 11 February 2009, and formed by Craiova and other 23 other nearby communities. The population of this area is 356,544.

As defined by Eurostat, the Craiova functional urban area has a population of 325,499 residents (as of 2015).
