= Plenița =

- Commune
- Location in Romania
- Coordinates: 44°13′N 23°11′E
- Country: Romania
- County: Dolj

Government
  - Mayor (2020–2024): Mihai-Puiu Calafeteanu (PNL)
- Area: 88.65 km^{2} (34.23 sq mi)
- Elevation: 159 m (522 ft)
- Population (2021-12-01): 4,156
  - Density: 46.88/km^{2} (121.4/sq mi)
- Time zone: UTC+02:00 (EET)
  - Summer (DST): UTC+03:00 (EEST)
- Postal code: 207460
- Area code: +(40) 251
- Vehicle reg.: DJ
- Website: plenita.ro

Plenița is a commune in Dolj County, Oltenia, Romania with a population of 4,156 people as of 2021. It is composed of two villages, Castrele Traiane and Plenița.

The locality was a town until 1950. It is located in the western part of the county, at a distance of 60 km (37 mi) from the county seat, Craiova, and 16 km (9.9 mi) from the Danube, on the border with Mehedinți County. Its neighbors are the following communes: Verbița to the north; Orodel and Caraula to the east; Unirea to the south; and Dârvari and Oprișor (from Mehedinți County) to the west and northwest.

Historical population
Year	Pop.	±%
2002	5,281	—
2011	4,686	−11.3%
2021	4,156	−11.3%
Source: Census data

== Notable figures ==
- Dragoș Albu (born 2001), footballer
- Vintilă Ciocâlteu (1890–1947), physician, biochemist, researcher, professor, and author
- Nicolae Ciucă (born 1967), politician and retired general
