= Fântâna Fătului =

- Location within Romania

Location
- Country: Romania
- Counties: Dolj County
- Villages: Seaca de Câmp, Negoi

Physical characteristics
- Mouth: Balasan
  - coordinates: 43.8846°N 23.4350°E
- Length: 19 km (12 mi)
- Basin size: 458 km^{2} (177 sq mi)

Basin features
- Progression: Balasan→ Danube→ Black Sea

The Fântâna Fătului is a right tributary of the river Balasan in Romania. It flows into the Balasan near Catane. Its length is 19 km (12 mi) and its basin size is 458 km^{2} (177 sq mi).
