= Balasan (river) =

Balasan Sărăceaua
- Location within Romania

Location
- Country: Romania
- Counties: Dolj County
- Cities: Băilești

Physical characteristics
- Mouth: Danube
  - location: Catane
  - coordinates: 43.8575°N 23.4191°E
- Length: 80 km (50 mi)
- Basin size: 890 km^{2} (340 sq mi)

Basin features
- Progression: Danube→ Black Sea
- Tributaries
  - right: Fântâna Fătului

The Balasan (also: Sărăceaua) is a left tributary of the Danube in Romania. It flows into the Danube between Negoi and Bistrețu Nou. Its length is 80 km (50 mi) and its basin size is 890 km^{2} (340 sq mi).
