= Unirea =

Unirea may refer to:

== Places in Romania ==
- Unirea, Alba, a commune
- Unirea, Brăila, a commune
- Unirea, Călărași, a commune
- Unirea, Dolj, a commune and village
- General Berthelot, a commune in Hunedoara, called Unirea from 1965 to 2001
- Jurilovca, a commune in Tulcea, called Unirea from 1983 to 1996
- Unirea (also Wallendorf or Aldorf), a district of Bistrița
- Unirea, a village in Odobești, Vrancea
- Unirea (river), a tributary of the River Mureș in Transylvania
- Unirea Shopping Center, in Unirii Square, Bucharest

== Romanian football clubs ==
- FC Unirea Alba Iulia, from Alba Iulia, Alba
- FC Unirea Dej, from Dej, Cluj
- CS Unirea Sânnicolau Mare, from Sânnicolau Mare, Timiş
- CS Municipal Unirea Slobozia, from Slobozia, Ialomiţa
- CS Unirea Tărlungeni, a former club from Tărlungeni, Brașov and Ștefăneștii de Jos, Ilfov
- Unirea Tricolor București, from Bucharest
- FC Unirea Urziceni, from Urziceni, Ialomița

== Other uses ==
- Unirea (newspaper), a newspaper published at Blaj, Transylvania, Romania
- MT Unirea, a 1980 Romanian-flagged crude oil carrier

== See also ==
- Stadionul Unirea (disambiguation), various stadiums in Romania
- Unirea National College (disambiguation), various educational institutions in Romania
