= Brădești (Jiu) =

- Location within Romania

Location
- Country: Romania
- Counties: Dolj County
- Villages: Brădeștii Bătrâni, Moșneni, Almăj

Physical characteristics
- Mouth: Jiu
  - coordinates: 44.4272°N 23.6646°E
- Length: 22 km (14 mi)
- Basin size: 47 km^{2} (18 sq mi)

Basin features
- Progression: Jiu→ Danube→ Black Sea
- Tributaries
  - left: Meteu

The Brădești is a left tributary of the river Jiu in Romania. It flows into the Jiu near Beharca. Its length is 22 km (14 mi) and its basin size is 47 km^{2} (18 sq mi).
