= Argetoaia (river) =

- Location within Romania

Location
- Country: Romania
- Counties: Mehedinți, Dolj
- Villages: Dumbrava de Jos, Argetoaia, Scăești

Physical characteristics
- Mouth: Jiu
  - location: Scăești
  - coordinates: 44.4761°N 23.5975°E
- Length: 50 km (31 mi)
- Basin size: 249 km^{2} (96 sq mi)

Basin features
- Progression: Jiu→ Danube→ Black Sea
- Tributaries
  - left: Țânțăr
  - right: Gârcotin

The Argetoaia is a right tributary of the river Jiu in Romania. It discharges into the Jiu in Scăești. Its length is 50 km (31 mi) and its basin size is 249 km^{2} (96 sq mi).
