= Măceșu =

Măceșu may refer to several places in Romania:

- Măceșu, a village in Târgu Cărbunești town, Gorj County
- Măceșu de Jos, a commune in Dolj County
- Măceșu de Sus, a commune in Dolj County
