= Coțofenii =

Coțofenii may refer to one of two communes in Dolj County, Romania:

- Coțofenii din Dos
- Coțofenii din Față

== See also ==
- Coțofeni culture
- Coțofana River
- Coțofanca, a village in Călărași County, Romania
- Coțofănești, a village in Bacău County, Romania
- Coțofenești, a village in Prahova County, Romania
