= Piscu (disambiguation) =

Piscu (Romanian for "the peak") starts off the names of several places in Romania:

- Piscu, Galați County
- Piscu, Ilfov County
- Piscu Corbului
- Piscu Lung
- Piscu Mare
- Piscu Nou
- Piscu Pietrei
- Piscu Radului
- Piscu Reghiului
- Piscu Rusului
- Piscu Sadovei
- Piscu Scoarţei
- Piscu Vechi
