= Merețel =

- Location within Romania

Location
- Country: Romania
- Counties: Dolj County
- Villages: Gogoșu, Sopot

Physical characteristics
- Mouth: Raznic
  - coordinates: 44.3674°N 23.6201°E
- Length: 42 km (26 mi)
- Basin size: 278 km^{2} (107 sq mi)

Basin features
- Progression: Raznic→ Jiu→ Danube→ Black Sea
- Tributaries
  - right: Recea, Brabova, Pleșoi

The Merețel is a right tributary of the river Raznic in Romania. It discharges into the Raznic in Predești. Its length is 42 km (26 mi) and its basin size is 278 km^{2} (107 sq mi).
