= Preajba =

Preajba may refer to several villages in Romania:

- Preajba, a village in Malu Mare Commune, Dolj County
- Preajba, a village in Poeni Commune, Teleorman County
- Preajba de Jos and Preajba de Pădure, villages in Teslui Commune, Dolj County
- Preajba Mare, a village in Târgu Jiu city, Gorj County
