= Raznic =

River in Romania

Raznic Obedeanca
- Location within Romania

Location
- Country: Romania
- Counties: Dolj County
- Villages: Grecești, Cernătești, Predești, Breasta

Physical characteristics
- Mouth: Jiu
  - location: Breasta
  - coordinates: 44.3281°N 23.7070°E
- Length: 58 km (36 mi)
- Basin size: 498 km^{2} (192 sq mi)

Basin features
- Progression: Jiu→ Danube→ Black Sea
- Tributaries
  - left: Mascot
  - right: Merețel, Breasta

The Raznic (also: Obedeanca) is a right tributary of the river Jiu in Romania. It discharges into the Jiu in Breasta. Its length is 58 km (36 mi) and its basin size is 498 km^{2} (192 sq mi).
