= Afumați =

Afumați may refer to several places in Romania:

- Afumați, Dolj, a commune in Dolj County
- Afumați, Ilfov, a commune in Ilfov County
  - CS Afumați, an association football club based in Afumați, Ilfov
- Afumați, a village in Leleasca Commune, Olt County
