= Gil Dobrică =

Romanian singer

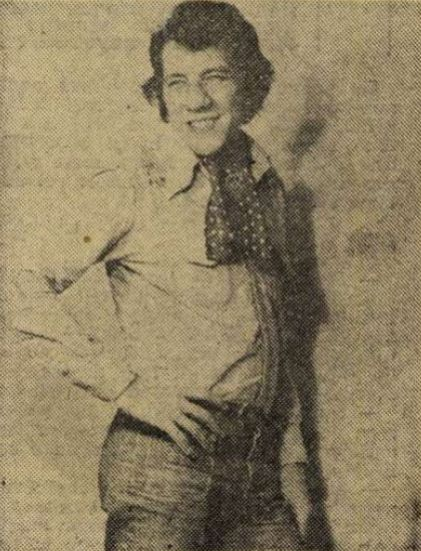
Gil Dobrică, c. 1976

Gil Dobrică (Romanian pronunciation: [ˈd͡ʒil doˈbrikə]; February 14, 1946 – April 17, 2007) was a Romanian singer. He is most famous for his 1979 cover version of John Denver's song "Take Me Home, Country Roads" or simply "Country Roads" (adapted as "Hai acasă" - "Come on Home"), although he had performed a variety of musical genres (pop, rock, blues, soul, jazz, country) and performed several covers of artists as diverse as Ray Charles, Little Richard, Otis Redding, and Bill Monroe.

Born in Călărași, Dolj County, Gil Dobrică moved to Craiova when he was 14, where he went to a vocational school and became a lathe operator. When he was 17, he started singing at the workers' club in the November 7 Factory in Craiova, with a repertoire ranging from jazz, soul, rock to swing.

In the 1970s, he came to Bucharest and started collaborating with the band Sfinx. During the same period he recorded his most famous song Hai acasă ("Let's Go Home"), a Romanian adaptation of John Denver's Take Me Home, Country Roads. Gil Dobrică made his impact in Romanian music history by adapting into Romanian various rock and roll, blues and soul hits, including songs by Ray Charles, Bill Monroe, Otis Redding, Little Richard and others.

He also made a memorable cameo in the popular Uncle Marin, the Billionaire movie (released in 1979 and starring Amza Pellea).

Gil Dobrică died in Craiova due to severe gout complications on April 17, 2007.
