= Malu Mare oil field =

Oilfield in Romania

Malu Mare
- Country: Romania
- Region: Dolj County
- Offshore/onshore: onshore
- Operator: Petrom

Field history
- Discovery: 1984
- Start of production: 1985

Production
- Current production of oil: 3,000 barrels per day (~1.5×10^{5} t/a)
- Estimated oil in place: 97 million tonnes (~ 115×10^{6} m^{3} or 723 million bbl)
- Estimated gas in place: 464×10^{9} m^{3} 16.24×10^{12} cu ft

The Malu Mare oil field is an oil field located in Malu Mare, Dolj County. It was discovered in 1984 and developed by Petrom. It began production in 1985 and produces oil and natural gas. The total proven reserves of the Malu Mare oil field are around 723 million barrels (97 million tonnes), and production is centered on 2,000 barrels per day (320 m^{3}/d).
