= Teiu River =

Teiu River may refer to:

- Teiu, a tributary of the Lotru in Vâlcea County, Romania
- Teiul, a tributary of the Baboia in Dolj County, Romania
