= Nisipuri =

Nisipuri may refer to several villages in Romania:

- Nisipuri, a village in Ulmi Commune, Dâmboviţa County
- Nisipuri, a village in Dobroteşti Commune, Dolj County
