= Smârdan =

Smârdan, as well Smîrdan or Smurdan, may refer to several places:

Romania

- Smârdan, Galați, a commune in Galați County
- Smârdan, Tulcea, a commune in Tulcea County
- Smârdan, a village in Brădeanu Commune, Buzău County
- Smârdan, a village in Suharău Commune, Botoșani County
- Smârdan, a village in Ciupercenii Noi Commune, Dolj County
- Smârdan, a village in Beciu Commune, Teleorman County

Bulgaria

- Inovo (formerly Smârdan), a village in Vidin Municipality, Vidin Province
- Vidin-Smurdan, alternative name of Vidin airport, adjacent to Inovo village
