= Boureni =

Boureni may refer to several villages in Romania:

- Boureni, a village in Afumați Commune, Dolj County
- Boureni, a village in Balș Commune, Iași County
- Boureni, a village in Moțca Commune, Iași County
