= Ghidici =

- Commune
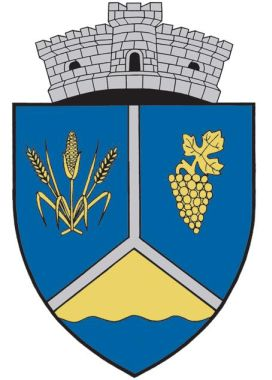
- Coat of arms

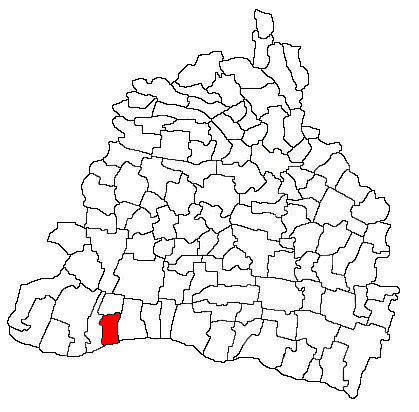
- Location in Dolj County

- Location in Romania
- Coordinates: 43°53′N 23°12′E
- Country: Romania
- County: Dolj
- Area: 44.48 km^{2} (17.17 sq mi)
- Population (2021-12-01): 2,437
  - Density: 54.79/km^{2} (141.9/sq mi)
- Time zone: UTC+02:00 (EET)
  - Summer (DST): UTC+03:00 (EEST)
- Vehicle reg.: DJ

Ghidici is a commune in Dolj County, Oltenia, Romania with a population of 2,408 people. It is composed of a single village, Ghidici, part of Piscu Vechi Commune until 2004, when it was split off.
