= Băilești =

- Municipality
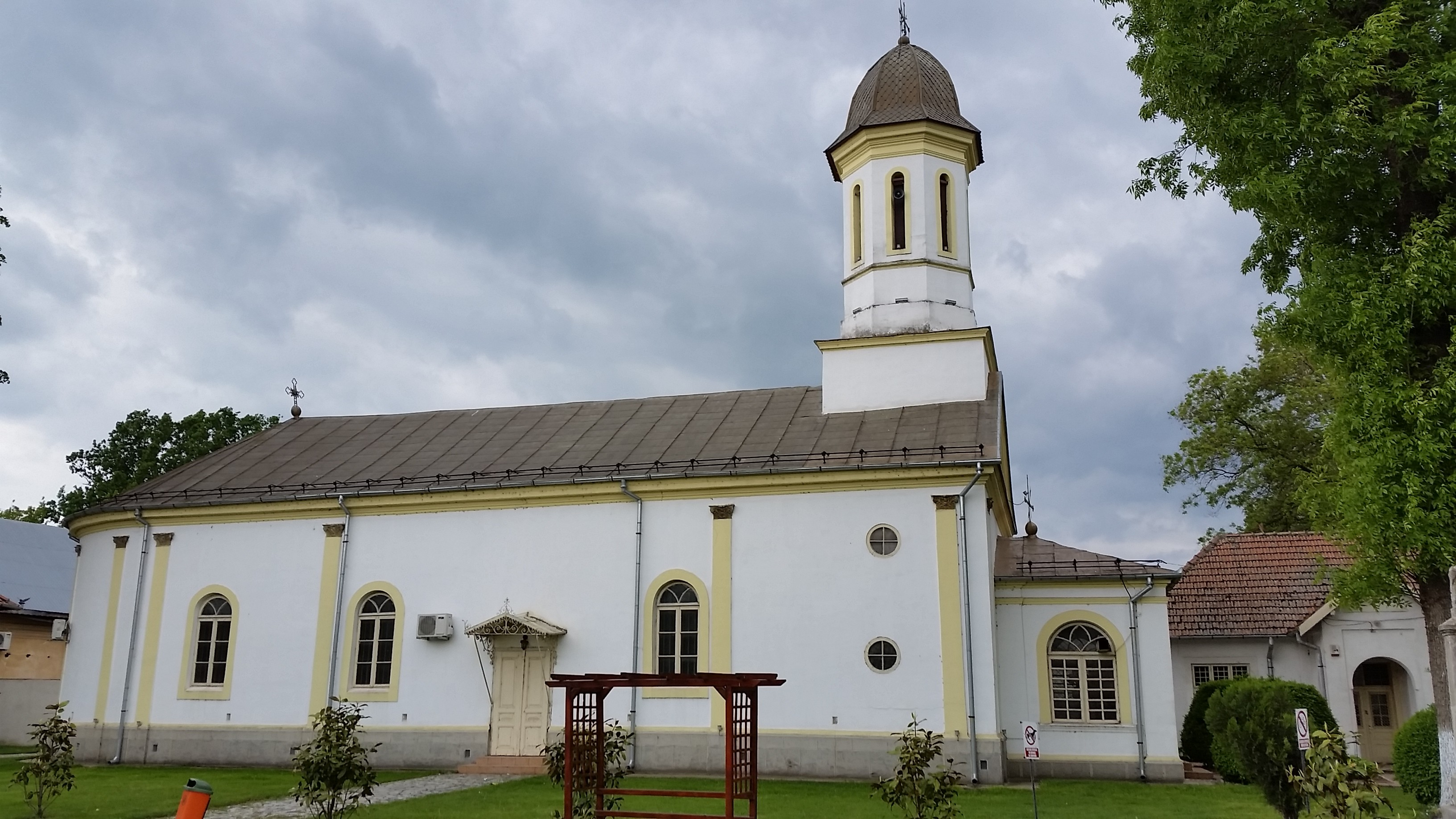
- Church of the Holy Apostles in Băilești

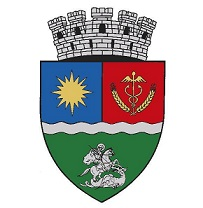
- Coat of arms

- Location in Romania
- Coordinates: 44°1′51″N 23°21′9″E
- Country: Romania
- County: Dolj

Government
  - Mayor (2024–2028): Irinel-Codruț Mușuroi (PSD)
- Area: 163.76 km^{2} (63.23 sq mi)
- Elevation: 80 m (260 ft)
- Population (2021-12-01): 15,928
  - Density: 97.264/km^{2} (251.91/sq mi)
- Time zone: UTC+02:00 (EET)
  - Summer (DST): UTC+03:00 (EEST)
- Postal code: 205100
- Area code: (+40) 02 51
- Vehicle reg.: DJ
- Website: www.primariabailesti.ro

Băilești (Romanian pronunciation: [bə.iˈleʃtʲ]) is a city in Dolj County, Oltenia, Romania, with a population of 15,928 in 2021. One village, Balasan, is administered by the city.

== Geography ==
The city lies in the western part of the Wallachian Plain, on the banks of the Balasan River, which flows into the Danube some 20 km (12 mi) to the south. Băilești is located in the southern half of Dolj County, 57 km (35 mi) southwest of the county seat, Craiova and 32 km (20 mi) northeast of Calafat, a port city on the Danube.

== History ==
Historical population
Year	Pop.	±%
1930	13,169	—
1948	15,289	+16.1%
1956	15,932	+4.2%
1966	18,490	+16.1%
1977	19,890	+7.6%
1992	22,344	+12.3%
2002	22,231	−0.5%
2011	16,283	−26.8%
2021	15,928	−2.2%
Source: Census data

The first documentary attestation of the town dates from January 4, 1536, during the reign of Prince Radu Paisie; the document recalls that the town existed since the time of Voivode Mircea the Elder.

During World War I, 156 people from Băilești died on the battlefield; in 1924 sculptor Ioan Iordănescu constructed the Monument of the Băilești Heroes in their honor. During World War II, 108 citizens of Băilești died on the battlefield.

In 2001, Băilești was declared a municipality. The city has been expanding during the past few years; several commercial centers have been built, while banks and old buildings have been restored.

== Natives ==
- Ștefan Baiaram (born 2002), footballer
- Ștefan Bană (born 2004), footballer
- Augustin Botescu, football manager
- Georgiana Ciuciulete (born 1987), handballer
- Valerică Găman (born 1989), footballer
- Marcel Iureș (born 1951), stage and film actor
- Florea Martinovici (1940–2011), footballer
- Adriana Nechita (born 1983), handballer
- Amza Pellea (1931–1983), actor
- Joseph Schubert (1889–1952), Canadian politician
- Simona Staicu (born 1971), long-distance and marathon runner
