= Joseph Schubert (politician) =

Acting Mayor of Montreal
- In office August 29, 1927 – November 1927
- Preceded by: J.B. Rochon

Montreal City Councillor
- In office 1924–1939

Personal details
- Born: 1889 Băilești, Romania
- Died: March 7, 1952 (aged 62–63) Montreal, Quebec, Canada
- Party: Labour Party
- Occupation: Labour leader

Joseph Schubert (1889 - 7 March 1952) was a Canadian politician, who served on Montreal City Council from 1924 to 1939. Originally from Romania, Schubert was a prominent labour unionist in the city, and was the only Labour Party representative on Montreal's city council. One of his first prominent actions as a city councillor was a speech protesting police harassment of participants in the city's 1924 May Day parade.

In 1931, he built a public bathhouse at the corner of Bagg and St. Lawrence, which still stands today as the Schubert Bath (official French name: Bain Schubert).

He served for three months as the city's acting mayor, commencing August 29, 1927, under mayor Médéric Martin. (Despite the title "acting mayor", however, he was never the city's official leader; in modern terms, his role would be more accurately understood as that of a deputy mayor or a mayor pro tem.) Until the appointment of Michael Applebaum as interim mayor in 2012, he was the highest ranking Jewish official in the history of Montreal's municipal government.
