= Călărași, Dolj =

Călărași
- Commune
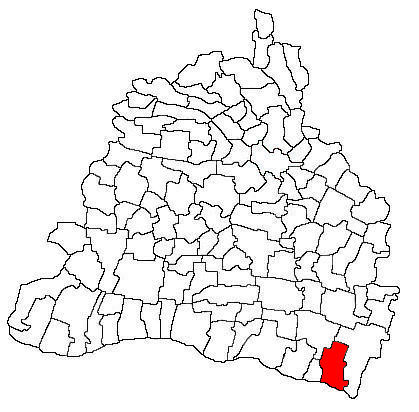
- Location in Dolj County

- Location in Romania
- Coordinates: 43°47′36″N 24°2′51″E
- Country: Romania
- County: Dolj

Government
  - Mayor (2024–2028): Sorin Sandu (PSD)
- Area: 55.52 km^{2} (21.44 sq mi)
- Elevation: 55 m (180 ft)
- Population (2021-12-01): 5,195
  - Density: 94/km^{2} (240/sq mi)
- Time zone: EET/EEST (UTC+2/+3)
- Postal code: 207170
- Area code: +(40) 251
- Vehicle reg.: DJ
- Website: primariacalarasi-dj.ro

Călărași (Romanian pronunciation: [kələˈraʃʲ]) is a commune in Dolj County, Oltenia, Romania with a population of 5,195 people as of 2021. It is composed of two villages, Călărași and Sărata.

== Natives ==
- Gil Dobrică (1946–2007), singer
