= Gita Luka =

Israeli actress (1921–2001)

- ג'טה לוקה
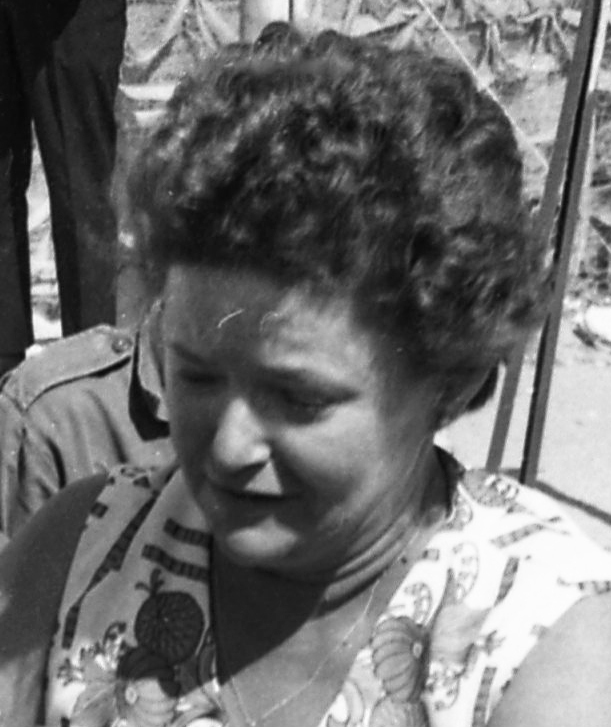
- Luka in 1974
- Born: 5 September 1921; Verbița, Romania
- Died: 22 August 2001 (aged 79); Netanya, Israel
- Other name: Getta Luca
- Occupations: Actress; comedian; singer
- Years active: 1948–1989
- Children: 1

Gita Luka (Hebrew: ג'טה לוקה; 5 September 1921 – 22 August 2001) was an Israeli actress, comedian and singer.

== Biography ==
Born in Romania, Luka had an impoverished childhood in a Jewish ghetto. She began attending and participating in Yiddish theatre groups when she reached her early 20s. In 1948, Luka and her family emigrated to Israel after surviving the Holocaust and made her career debut as a singer at the beginning of the War of Independence. Aside from performing songs in Hebrew, Luka also performed in Yiddish and Romanian.

Luka performed frequently as a singer in satire sketches at the Li-La-Lo Theatre and she starred in numerous musical adaptations of plays such as Heidi in 1969. She also made appearances at the Habima Theatre as well as at Hasimta Theatre and the Haifa Theatre. On screen, Luka participated in films such as Kazablan, One Pound Only and The Flying Matchmaker.

In 1988, Luka suffered a minor stroke and another one in 1995, which slowed down her ability to perform and eventually forced her to retire. She also underwent financial problems during the 1983 Israel bank stock crisis. Family friends of Luka organised a fundraiser to support her nursing home expenses. She was also financially supported by the Israeli Artists' Association.

=== Personal life ===
Luka married two times. From her first husband, she had one daughter, Rachel. She also had four grandchildren.

== Death ==
Luka died following a stroke in Netanya on 22 August 2001, at age 79. She was interred at Yarkon Cemetery.
