= Doina Ruști =

Romanian writer (born 1957)

- Born: 15 February 1957 (age 69); Comoșteni, Dolj County, Romania
- Education: University of Bucharest
- Occupation: Writer
- Writing career
- Language: Romanian
- Years active: 1998–present
- Period: postcommunist
- Genres: Fiction; surrealism; magical realism, Bildungsroman
- Notable works: ‘'Ferenike,Occult Beds, Homeric, The Phanariot Manuscript, Lizoanca at the Age of Eleven, The Ghost in the Mill,’’The Book of Perilous Dishes, Zogru
- Notable awards: Romanian Academy's Ion Creangă Award; Romanian Writer's Union Prose Award; Bucharest Writers Association Award
- Website: doinarusti.ro

Doina Ruști (Romanian pronunciation: [dojna ruʃti]; born 15 February 1957) is a Romanian writer and novelist.

Some of her novels are: Fantoma din moară 2008, Zogru, 2006, and Lizoanca la 11 ani, 2009. Her best-known novel in the English-speaking world is The Book of Perilous Dishes.

== Biography ==
Ruști was born in Comoșteni, Dolj County. She was brought up in a village in the south of Romania by her parents and teachers, struggling to survive in a communist world.

Her blood accommodates ancestry ranging from Montenegrin to Danubian Romanians, all with long names ending in -escu, most of them teachers, store keepers, and horse dealers. Her childhood home in Comoșteni preserved the experiences of a Balkan world, collected throughout hundreds of years.

Ruști's youth was spent in a house which had saved the traces of a past rich in events, carriages, coffers, and period clothes, crowned by plenty of books and objects which incited her imagination. But this world had brutally come to an end. When she was eleven, her father was murdered under mysterious circumstances, which have not been elucidated even to this day. The insecurity, oppression, absurd rules and chaos installed at the end of communism blended with the fantastic universe of a village governed by ghost tales, hierophanies, and underground forces, and this dramatic and magical setting inspired the novel Fantoma din moară (The Ghost in the Mill). For this novel, she was awarded the Prize of the Writers' Union of Romania.

== Work ==
Pompilia Chifu describes Doina Ruști's fiction as a broad and coherent epic territory and identifies originality as one of its defining features. In her monograph, she argues that this hallmark is already visible in Ruști's debut, in her choice of subjects, characters, and narrative structures.

From her earliest novels, critics noted the unconventional character of Ruști's narrative designs. Chifu argues that several of the unusual themes introduced by the novelist were later taken up by other writers. The novelty lies not only in the choice of subject matter, but also in its transformation into memorable narrative mechanisms: the virtual world of Omulețul roșu, the being that travels through centuries and through human bodies in Zogru, the tripartite structure of Fantoma din moară, the social case recast as a polyphonic novel in Lizoanca la 11 ani, and the history constructed out of five words in Manuscrisul fanariot.

== Themes ==
=== Femininity as a social role ===
One of the major themes is femininity understood as a social role, subject to the pressures of family, community, and institutions. The feminism of these novels is neither programmatic nor articulated through explicit discourse; rather, it is made manifest through the narrative situations into which the characters are placed.

In Lizoanca la 11 ani, a girl's body becomes the focus of public accusation, while the violence of the community and the failure of institutions remain almost invisible. Adina Mocanu examines the vulnerability of girls during the post-communist transition, the sexualisation of the child, and victim-blaming as social products rather than merely individual tragedies.

In Fantoma din moară, women's experience is woven into the memory of communist oppression. The characters move through contradictory forms of vulnerability, power, compromise, and survival, as personal history intersects with collective history.

=== Communism ===
Communism forms another central strand of the work, but it appears not merely as a political regime or historical setting. It is figured as an organic evil capable of penetrating the family, language, human relationships, and the memory of a community. Chifu calls it "a ghost with a thousand faces", a presence that outlives institutions and continues to deform individual lives.

Paul Cernat, Bianca Burța-Cernat, and Daniel Cristea-Enache have examined the way Fantoma din moară transforms historical fact through symbolic construction without diminishing its social truth. Raluca Oproiu reads the novel as a form of post-communist Gothic in which the ghost expresses collective guilt, the loss of autonomy, fractured relationships, fear, and the anxiety of life under dictatorship.

Mihai Iovănel emphasised the construction of the central section, "The Mill", which he called "exceptional", praising "the construction and the ability to suggest the texture of a human world".

This reading is complemented by studies of the loss of historical memory and of the mythical rewritings of late communism, which place the novel within a broader East-Central European context.

=== Balkanism and the Phanariot territory ===
Balkanism functions as a matrix of the imagination, generating a mental geography, linguistic plurality, and an identity shaped by the encounter of different worlds. In Enciclopedia imaginariilor din România, Călin Teutișan includes Ruști's fiction in his analysis of the Levantine imaginary, in the subchapter devoted to the "Levantine fantastic".

Mircea Muthu traces this dimension in the lexicon and structure of Manuscrisul fanariot, while Alina Bako examines the multicultural otherness and symbolic geography of Ruști's fiction. Gastronomy, clothing, smells, languages, and occupations become signs through which characters recognise one another, conceal themselves, or alter their status.

The Phanariot Trilogy comprising Manuscrisul fanariot, Mâța Vinerii, and Homeric establishes eighteenth-century Bucharest as a recurring and distinctive fictional territory in Ruști's work. In readings by Călin Dan and Adrian Jicu, the Phanariot space acquires an identity-bearing dimension rather than remaining mere historical scenery. The city is reconstructed from marginal documents, words, manuscripts, recipes, rumours, forms of slavery, erotic histories, and minor lives.

Emanuel Lupașcu notes that this world combines historiographic metafiction, magical realism, and the historical novel, becoming a space at once real and imagined, layered with gastronomic, erotic, and sociocultural meanings.

=== The fantastic ===
The fantastic is one of the work's distinctive signatures, though its roots remain deeply embedded in social reality and history. The uncanny does not negate reality; it reveals its concealed mechanisms. In Zogru, a disembodied spirit enters people's blood and travels through history, becoming both its witness and its victim.

Chifu argues that Dan C. Mihăilescu was the first Romanian critic to discuss Gothic elements in Ruști's fiction, in a 2006 television review of Zogru. Mihăilescu related the character to the Gothic novel, fantastic literature, and the tradition of the demon in the Russian novel; Chifu develops this observation into an account of the neo-Gothic.

The collection Cămașa în carouri is set in motion by eight sounds that alter destinies and fragments of the city's history. In Homeric, immortality assumes a strange yet credible form within the logic of the archaic forest, while in Mâța Vinerii the magical recipe book links food to memory, power, and transformation. In Manuscrisul fanariot, the fantastic spreads through words, rumours, disease, and spaces with labyrinthine histories.

Dumitru-Mircea Buda sums up the mechanism of the fantastic in Homeric: rigorous research, imaginative construction, and the reality effect sustain one another, while the fantastic world acquires authenticity through the accumulation of invented details. Anca Luminița Eftenie, in turn, identifies three modes of the fantastic in Ruști's work: the archaic marvellous, magical realism, and fantasy.

== Style ==
The style is recognisable for its narrative energy, sensory density, and mobility across registers. Dan C. Mihăilescu considered it to have few equivalents in Romanian prose, while Cătălin Sturza described it as fluid, intensely sensory, lexically simple, yet sustained by an ornate, multi-layered, and flexible construction.

One of its distinctive elements is the linguistic imagination. In Manuscrisul fanariot, the architecture of the novel grows out of the history of words that generate events, characters, and social relationships. Words such as sudit, chilipir, and București do not merely explain the world; they bring it into being. Adrian Jicu called the novel "a small treatise on the demiurgic power of the word".

A sentence can unfold an entire story from an object, a smell, or a single epithet; conversely, it can compress a character's fate into a comparison or a phrase. Alessandra Iadicicco noted an explosion of original and incisive expressions, while Ramón Acín drew attention to the pictorial and cinematic quality of the portraits. Ioan Groșan and Bianca Burța-Cernat likewise remarked on Ruști's art of portraiture and her ability to individualise both central characters and episodic figures.

Chifu identifies the construction of endings as a recurring feature of Ruști's fiction: secondary threads, details, and apparently self-contained episodes converge in an unexpected resolution that retrospectively alters the meaning of the story. In Chifu's reading, the originality of these narrative resolutions and the final knotting together of narrative strands are consistent hallmarks of the work.

== Reception and circulation ==
The work has appeared in numerous editions and translations and has generated an extensive body of criticism, including reviews, academic studies, doctoral dissertations, and monographs. The principal synthetic accounts include Pompilia Chifu's monograph, the collective volume Doina Ruști. Lumi, istorii, „combinații simbolice”, edited by Emanuela Ilie, and the entry devoted to Ruști in Dicționarul general al literaturii române.

Its inclusion in textbooks and school curricula confirms the circulation of Ruști's work beyond literary criticism and the university sphere. The translations have been accompanied by literary tours, festivals, and international debates.

== Novels ==
- Nas de bulgar, Humanitas, 2026
- Ferenike, Humanitas, 2025
- Platanos, ART, 2025
- Sălbatica, Booklet, 2025
- Zavaidoc în anul iubirii (Zavaidoc in the Year of Love), Bookzone, 2024
- Paturi oculte (Occult Beds), Litera, 2020
- Homeric, Polirom, 2019
- Logodnica (The Fiancée), Polirom, 2017
- ro:Mâța VineriiMâța Vinerii (The Book of Perilous Dishes), Polirom, 2017
- Lizoanca la 11 ani, Trei, 2009; Polirom, Top 10+, 2017
- Manuscrisul fanariot, (The Phanariot Manuscript) Polirom, 2015, 2016
- Zogru, 2nd ed, Polirom, Top 10+, 2013
- Mămica la două albăstrele (The Story of an Adulterer), Polirom, 2013
- Patru bărbați plus Aurelius (Four Men Plus Aurelius), Polirom, 2011
- Cămașa în carouri și alte 10 întâmplări din București (The Plaid Shirt and 10 Other Tales from Bucharest), a narrative puzzle, Polirom, 2010
- Fantoma din moară(The Ghost in the Mill/Das Phantom in der Muhle), Polirom, 2008.
- Zogru, Polirom, Iași, 2006, 2nd ed, 2013
- Omulețul roșu (The Little Red Man), Editura Vremea, Bucharest, 2004

== Translated work ==
- The Book of Perilous Dishes, Neem Tree Press, London, 2022
- La gata del viernes (translation Enrique Nogueras, Esdrújula Ediciones, Granada, 2019
- Das Phantom in der Mühle (translation Eva Ruth Wemme), Klak Verlag, Berlin, 2017
- Lizoanca (trad. Szenkovics Enikő), Orpheusz, Budapest, 2015
- Eliza a los once años (translation Enrique Nogueras), Ediciones Traspiés, Granada, 2014
- Zogru (translation Szenkovics Enikő), Sétatér Kulturális Egyesüle, 2014
- Lisoanca, Rediviva Ed., Milano, 2013
- L'omino rosso, Nikita Editore, Firenze, 2012
- Bill Clinton's Hand, in Bucharest Tales, New Europe Writers, 2011 (coord: A. Fincham, J. G Coon, John a'Beckett)
- I miei ginecologi, in Compagne di viaggio, Sandro Teti Editore, 2011 (coord Radu Pavel Gheo, Dan Lungu)
- Zogru (transl. Roberto Merlo), Ed. Bonanno, Roma, 2010
- L'omino rosso (transl. Roberto Merlo) in Il romanzo romeno contemporaneo (coord Nicoleta Nesu) Ed. Bagatto Libri, Rome, 2010
- Cristian – Nagyvilag (transl. Noémi László), Budapesta, Sept. 2010
- The Winner – Nagyvilag (transl. Noémi László), Budapesta, Sept. 2010 etc.
- Cristian (trans. in fr. Linda Maria Baros), rev Le Bateau Fantôme, no. 8, 2009, Ed. Mathieu Hilfiger
- Zogru (transl. Vasilka Alexova), Ed. Balkani, 2008
- Dicționar de simboluri din opera lui Mircea Eliade (frag.) în La Jornada Semanal, nr. 455, 456, Mexico City, 2003 (trans: José Antonio Hernández García)
- Lizoanca (trans Jan Cornelius), Horlemann Verlag, Berlin

== Literary prizes ==
- The Romanian Academy's Ion Creangă Prize for the novel "Lizoanca at the Age of Eleven", 2009
- The Prize of the Writers Union of Romania for the novel "The Ghost in the Mill", 2008
- The Golden Medal of Schitul Darvari, for literary activity, 2008
- The Prize of the Bucharest Writers Association for the novel "Zogru", 2007.

== Bibliography ==
- Bako, Alina (2025). Cartografii ficționale. Perspective asupra prozei românești (in Romanian). Cluj-Napoca: Casa Cărții de Știință. ISBN 978-606-17-2456-7.
- Bădulescu, Dana (2025). "Three Apples Fell from the Sky in Armenia and the Balkans". In Bădulescu, Dana; Draga Alexandru, Maria-Sabina; Năstase, Florina (eds.). Women’s Imaginary Cooking and Appetites Across Cultures: Studies in Literature, Media and Film. Cambridge Scholars Publishing. pp. 46–64. ISBN 978-1-0364-4381-8.
- Buda, Dumitru-Mircea (2019). "Homeric or about the Magical Powers of Storytelling" (PDF). Acta Marisiensis. Philologia. 1 (1): 127–130. doi:10.2478/amph-2022-0014.
- Burța-Cernat, Bianca (29 January 2009). "Reabilitarea „iluziei realiste"". Observator cultural (in Romanian).
- Cernat, Paul (December 2008). "Comunismul românesc în moara realismului magic". Revista 22 (in Romanian). No. 2. Bucureștiul cultural supplement.
- Chifu, Pompilia (2025). Doina Ruști, un personaj în propria carte. Particularități tematice, construcție textuală și profil identitar în proza Doinei Ruști (in Romanian). Cluj-Napoca: Casa Cărții de Știință. ISBN 978-606-17-2448-2.
- Crașovan, Elena (2017). "The World of the Living Dead: Mythical Rewritings of History in the Postapocalyptic Narratives about Late Communism" (PDF). Dacoromania Litteraria. IV: 93–109.
- Dan, Călin (23 September 2016). "T-shirt. Contaminări: Vara fanarioților". Observator cultural (in Romanian).
- Ilie, Emanuela (2024). "Lizoanca la 11 ani. Copilărie devastată, sexualitate și abuz" (PDF). Annales Universitatis Apulensis. Series Philologica (in Romanian) (25/1).
- Ilie, Emanuela, ed. (2022). Doina Ruști. Lumi, istorii, „combinații simbolice” (in Romanian). Iași: Vasiliana ’98. ISBN 978-973-116-753-4.
- Iadicicco, Alessandra (12 May 2012). "L'omino rosso". La Stampa (in Italian). No. 1815.
- Iovănel, Mihai (29 January 2009). "Travelling circular". Cultura (in Romanian). No. 4.
- Jicu, Adrian (October 2015). "Manuscrisul fanariot – un roman fabulos" (PDF). Ateneu (in Romanian) (10).
- Muthu, Mircea (2017). Balcanismul literar românesc. Panoramic sud-est european – Confluențe culturale (in Romanian). Cluj-Napoca: Școala Ardeleană. ISBN 978-606-8770-99-4.
- Oproiu, Raluca (2011). "The Ghost of Communism Past: The Birth of Post-Communist Gothic Fiction?". Studies in Gothic Fiction. 1 (2): 12–22.
- Sanhueza, Leonardo (7 May 2018). "Llega a Chile un espíritu mortífero que se mete en la sangre de las personas". Las Últimas Noticias (in Spanish). Santiago de Chile.
- Sturza, Cătălin (16 April 2010). "Mesaj într-o sticlă de aer". Observator cultural (in Romanian).
- Adina Mocanu – La infancia en femenino las niñas, Icaria Editorial, Barcelona, 2016, p. 2017.
- Ramón Acín – Turia, 115, Instituto de Estudio Turolenses, 2015, p. 323
- Jeffrey Andrew Weinstock, The Ashgate Encyclopedia of Literary Cinematic Monsters, Routledge, New York, 2015
- Emanuela Illie – Fantastic și alteritate, Junimea, 2013, p. 92 și urm.
- Roberto Merlo – Quaderni di studi italieni e romeni, 5, 2010, Edizioni dell'Orso, p. 121
- Daniel Cristea Enache – Timpuri noi, Ed. Cartea Românească, 2009, pp 172; 174
- Dan C. Mihăilescu - Femeie cu omuleț, în vol.I Literatura română în postceaușism, II. Prezentul ca dezumanizare, Ed. Polirom, 2006, p. 248
- Dan C. Mihăilescu - Literatura româneasca în postceausism. II. Proza. Prezentul ca dezumanizare, cap. Realismul apocaliptic și deriziunea, Ed. Polirom, 2006, p. 251
- Geo Vasile - Elixirul narațiunii, in Romanul sau viața. Prozatori europeni, Ed. Muzeul Literaturii Române, 2007, p. 343 și urm.
- Gelu Ionescu - Târziu de departe, Ed. Cartea Românească, 2012, pp. 112 si urm
- Tania Radu - Jocuri riscante, in Chenzine literare, Humanitas, 2014
- Andrei Simuț - Romanul românesc postcomunist între trauma totalitară și criza prezentului. Tipologii, periodizări, contextualizări, chapter III.3. Panoramări ficționalizante ale trecutului comunist: Un singur cer deasupra lor, Fantoma din moară, Pupa russa, Editura Muzeul Literaturii Române, 2015
- Călin Teutișan - cap Fantasticul levantin, în Enciclopedia imaginariilor din România. Vol. I: Imaginar literar, coord. Corin Braga, Polirom, 2020.
- Raluca Andreescu, in Studies in Gothic Fiction, Zittaw Press, 2011
- Abina Puskás-Bajkó -Maiorca or on the gypsy magic realism of seduction in Doina Ruști's Manuscrisul fanariot, în Journal of Romanian Literary Studies, no. 6/2021, p. 546.
- Adriana Raducanu - Confessions from the Dead: Reading Ismail Kadare's Spiritus as a ‘Post-Communist Gothic’ Novel, în Postcolonial Europe? Essays on Post-Communist Literatures and Cultures, Editors: Dobrota Pucherova and Robert Gafrik, Brill, 2015
- Christene d’Anca - Mediating a loss of history in Doina Rusti's The Ghost in the Mill by Journal of European Studies, vol. 48, 3-4: pp. 265–277. First published October 22, 2018.
- Dana Sala - Alessandro Baricco's Seta (Silk) and Doina Ruști's Manuscrisul fanariot (The Phanariot Manuscript), in Weaving a Narrative from Metamorphoses, 2015 ALLRO, Volume 22, Article code 487-121
- Alina Bako - Images of Alterity in the Contemporary Feminine Prose, Speculum, 2017
- Bianca Burța Cernat, Ficțiune și magie în Bucureștiul fanariot, Observator Cultural, nr. 863, 2017
