= Giubega =

- Commune
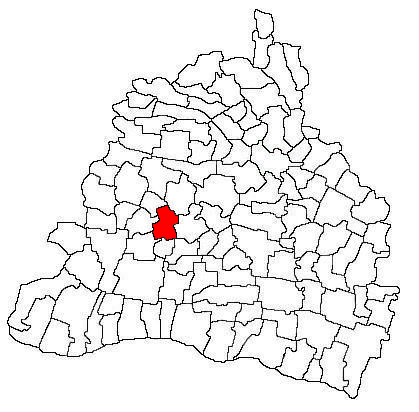
- Location in Dolj County

- Location in Romania
- Coordinates: 44°7′N 23°25′E
- Country: Romania
- County: Dolj

Government
  - Mayor (2020–2024): Stelian Gună (PSD)
- Area: 52.61 km^{2} (20.31 sq mi)
- Elevation: 116 m (381 ft)
- Population (2021-12-01): 1,782
  - Density: 33.87/km^{2} (87.73/sq mi)
- Time zone: UTC+02:00 (EET)
  - Summer (DST): UTC+03:00 (EEST)
- Postal code: 207290
- Area code: +(40) 251
- Vehicle reg.: DJ
- Website: primaria-giubega.ro

Giubega is a commune in Dolj County, Oltenia, Romania with a population of 1,782 people as of 2021. It is composed of a single village, Giubega. It also included the village of Galiciuica until 2004, when it was split off to form a separate commune.
