= Gângiova =

- Commune
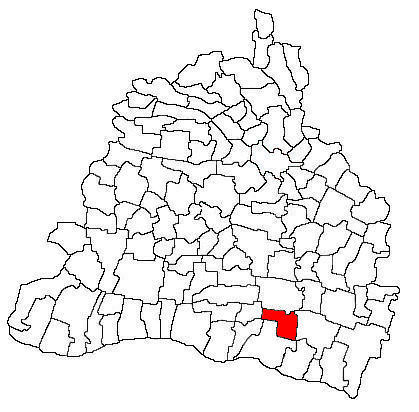
- Location in Dolj County

- Location in Romania
- Coordinates: 43°54′N 23°51′E
- Country: Romania
- County: Dolj

Government
  - Mayor (2024–2028): Cristache Preda (PSD)
- Area: 56.19 km^{2} (21.70 sq mi)
- Elevation: 44 m (144 ft)
- Population (2021-12-01): 2,312
  - Density: 41/km^{2} (110/sq mi)
- Time zone: EET/EEST (UTC+2/+3)
- Postal code: 207275
- Area code: +(40) 251
- Vehicle reg.: DJ
- Website: www.comunagingiova.ro

Gângiova is a commune in Dolj County, Oltenia, Romania with a population of 2,312 people as of 2021. It is composed of two villages, Comoșteni and Gângiova.

Historical population
Year	Pop.	±%
2002	2,935	—
2011	2,478	−15.6%
2021	2,312	−6.7%
Source: Census data

== Natives ==
- Doina Ruști (born 1957), novelist
