= Bratovoești =

- Commune
- Location in Dolj County

- Location in Romania
- Coordinates: 44°7′48″N 23°53′59″E
- Country: Romania
- County: Dolj

Government
  - Mayor (2024–2028): Ion Oancea (PSD)
- Area: 45.94 km^{2} (17.74 sq mi)
- Elevation: 60 m (200 ft)
- Population (2021-12-01): 3,230
  - Density: 70.3/km^{2} (182/sq mi)
- Time zone: UTC+02:00 (EET)
  - Summer (DST): UTC+03:00 (EEST)
- Postal code: 207095
- Area code: +(40) 251
- Vehicle reg.: DJ
- Website: primariabratovoesti.ro

Bratovoești is a commune in Dolj County, Oltenia, Romania with a population of 3,230 as of 2021. It is composed of four villages: Bădoși, Bratovoești, Georocu Mare, and Prunet. It also included Rojiște and Tâmburești villages until 2004, when they were split off to form Rojiște Commune.
