= Rojiște =

- Commune
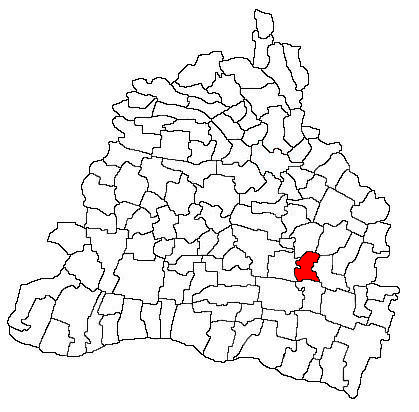
- Location in Dolj County

- Location in Romania
- Coordinates: 44°04′N 23°56′E
- Country: Romania
- County: Dolj
- Area: 32.85 km^{2} (12.68 sq mi)
- Population (2021-12-01): 2,498
  - Density: 76.04/km^{2} (196.9/sq mi)
- Time zone: UTC+02:00 (EET)
  - Summer (DST): UTC+03:00 (EEST)
- Vehicle reg.: DJ

Rojiște is a commune in Dolj County, Oltenia, Romania with a population of 1,600 people. It is composed of two villages, Rojiște and Tâmburești. These were part of Bratovoești Commune until 2004, when they were split off.
