= Amărăștii de Sus =

- Commune
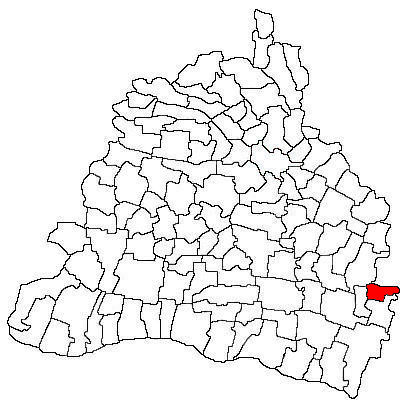
- Location in Dolj County

- Location in Romania
- Coordinates: 43°58′50″N 24°9′20″E
- Country: Romania
- County: Dolj

Government
  - Mayor (2024–2028): Iulian Duță (PSD)
- Area: 36.40 km^{2} (14.05 sq mi)
- Elevation: 119 m (390 ft)
- Population (2021-12-01): 1,541
  - Density: 42.34/km^{2} (109.6/sq mi)
- Time zone: UTC+02:00 (EET)
  - Summer (DST): UTC+03:00 (EEST)
- Postal code: 207025
- Area code: +(40) 251
- Vehicle reg.: DJ
- Website: comunaamarastiidesus.ro

Amărăștii de Sus is a commune in Dolj County, Oltenia, Romania with a population of 1,541 people as of 2021. It is composed of two villages, Amărăștii de Sus and Zvorsca. It also included Dobrotești and Nisipuri villages until 2004, when they were split off to form Dobrotești Commune.
