= Valea Stanciului =

- Commune
- Location in Romania
- Coordinates: 43°59′N 23°52′E
- Country: Romania
- County: Dolj
- Area: 110.48 km^{2} (42.66 sq mi)
- Population (2021-12-01): 4,806
  - Density: 43.50/km^{2} (112.7/sq mi)
- Time zone: UTC+02:00 (EET)
  - Summer (DST): UTC+03:00 (EEST)
- Vehicle reg.: DJ

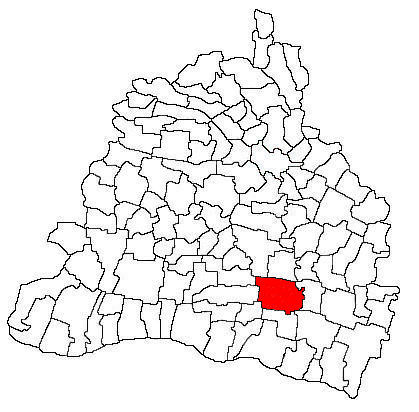
Map of Valea Stanciului

Valea Stanciului is a commune in Dolj County, Oltenia, Romania with a population of 4806 people as of the 2021 census. It was established in 1864. It is composed of two villages, Horezu-Poenari and Valea Stanciului.
