= Apele Vii =

- Commune
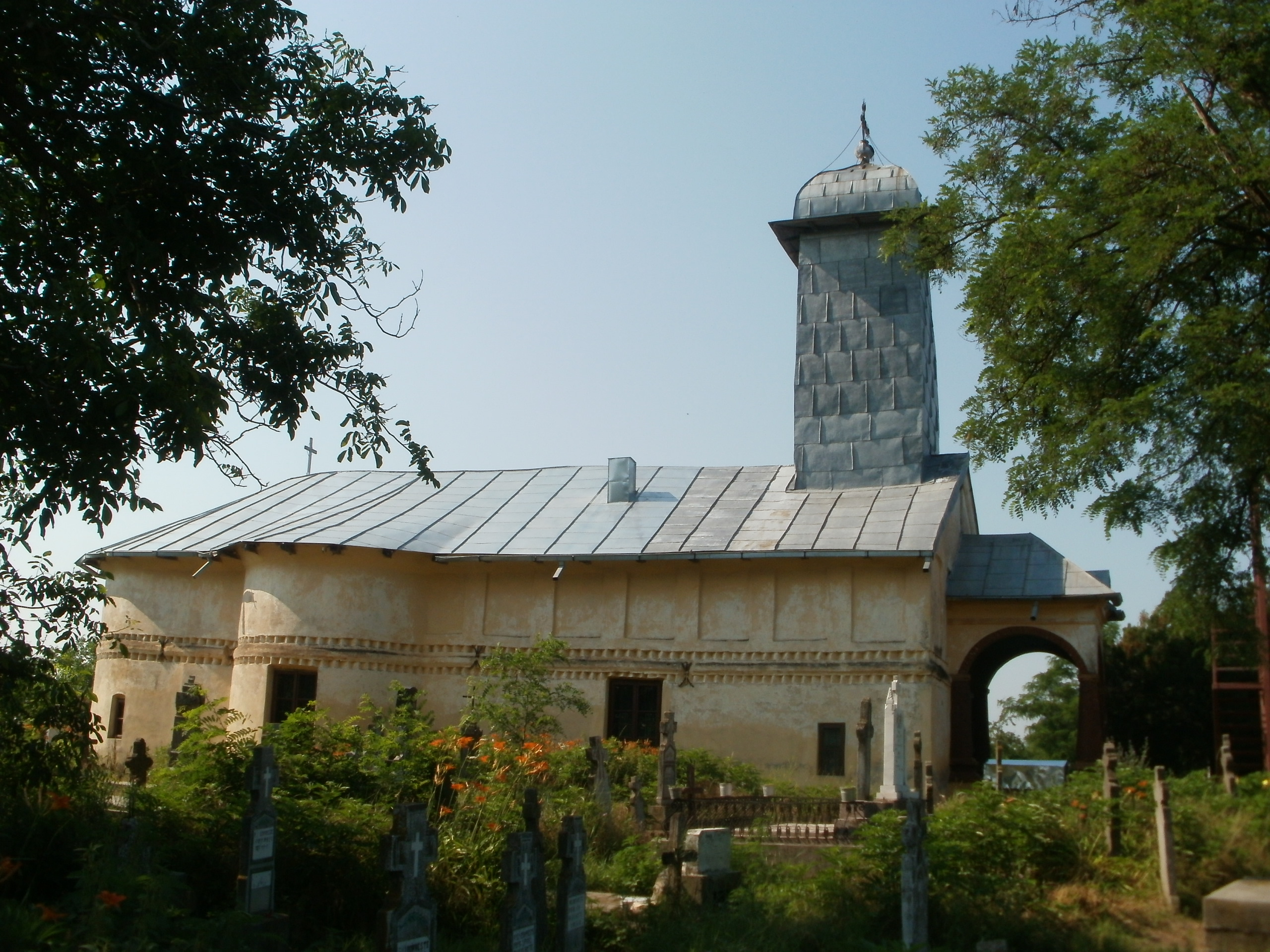
- Dormition of the Theotokos Church in Apele Vii

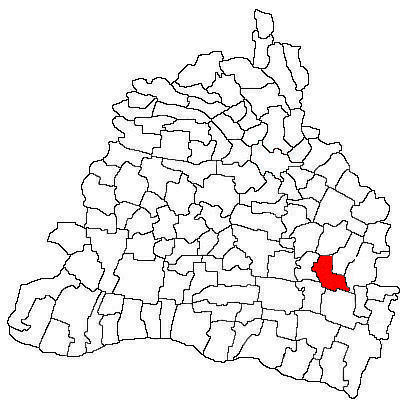
- Location in Dolj County

- Location in Romania
- Coordinates: 44°4′N 24°4′E
- Country: Romania
- County: Dolj

Government
  - Mayor (2020–2024): Augustin Stanciu (PNL)
- Area: 60.82 km^{2} (23.48 sq mi)
- Elevation: 140 m (460 ft)
- Population (2021-12-01): 1,804
  - Density: 29.66/km^{2} (76.82/sq mi)
- Time zone: UTC+02:00 (EET)
  - Summer (DST): UTC+03:00 (EEST)
- Postal code: 207030
- Area code: +(40) 251
- Vehicle reg.: DJ
- Website: primaria-apelevii.ro

Apele Vii is a commune in Dolj County, Oltenia, Romania with a population of 1,804 people as of 2021. It is composed of a single village, Apele Vii.

The commune is situated in the Wallachian Plain, at an altitude of 140 m (460 ft). It is located in the eastern part of the county, 41 km (25 mi) southeast of the county seat, Craiova.
