= Galiciuica =

- Commune
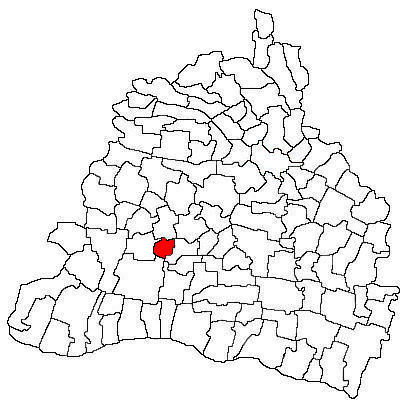
- Location in Dolj County

- Location in Romania
- Coordinates: 44°6′N 23°23′E
- Country: Romania
- County: Dolj
- Area: 25.97 km^{2} (10.03 sq mi)
- Population (2021-12-01): 1,310
  - Density: 50.4/km^{2} (131/sq mi)
- Time zone: UTC+02:00 (EET)
  - Summer (DST): UTC+03:00 (EEST)
- Vehicle reg.: DJ

Galiciuica is a commune in Dolj County, Oltenia, Romania with a population of 1,760 people. It is composed of a single village, Galiciuica, part of Giubega Commune until 2004, when it was split off.
