= Mârșani =

- Commune
- Location in Romania
- Coordinates: 44°1′N 24°1′E
- Country: Romania
- County: Dolj
- Area: 50.47 km^{2} (19.49 sq mi)
- Population (2021-12-01): 3,941
  - Density: 78.09/km^{2} (202.2/sq mi)
- Time zone: UTC+02:00 (EET)
  - Summer (DST): UTC+03:00 (EEST)
- Vehicle reg.: DJ

Mârșani is a commune in Dolj County, Oltenia, Romania with a population of 5,195 people. It is composed of a single village, Mârșani.
