= Ghindeni =

- Commune
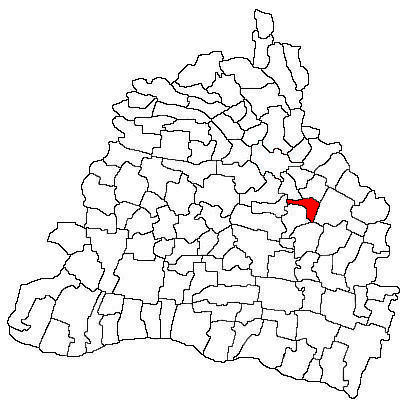
- Location in Dolj County

- Location in Romania
- Coordinates: 44°13′N 23°55′E
- Country: Romania
- County: Dolj
- Area: 29.34 km^{2} (11.33 sq mi)
- Population (2021-12-01): 1,843
  - Density: 62.82/km^{2} (162.7/sq mi)
- Time zone: UTC+02:00 (EET)
  - Summer (DST): UTC+03:00 (EEST)
- Vehicle reg.: DJ

Ghindeni is a commune in Dolj County, Oltenia, Romania with a population of 2,264 people. It is composed of a single village, Ghindeni, part of Malu Mare Commune until 2004, when it was split off.
