= Măceșu de Sus =

- Commune
- Location in Romania
- Coordinates: 43°55′N 23°42′E
- Country: Romania
- County: Dolj

Government
  - Mayor (2024–2028): Ciprian-Marian Nicu (PNL)
- Area: 35.5 km^{2} (13.7 sq mi)
- Elevation: 63 m (207 ft)
- Population (2021-12-01): 1,088
  - Density: 31/km^{2} (79/sq mi)
- Time zone: EET/EEST (UTC+2/+3)
- Postal code: 207375
- Area code: +(40) 251
- Vehicle reg.: DJ
- Website: www.comunamacesudesus.ro

Măceșu de Sus is a commune in Dolj County, Oltenia, Romania with a population of 1,088 people as of 2021. It is composed of a single village, Măceșu de Sus.
