= Scăești =

- Commune
- Location in Romania
- Coordinates: 44°28′N 23°34′E
- Country: Romania
- County: Dolj

Government
  - Mayor (2024–2028): Mihaela Mateescu (PSD)
- Area: 39.23 km^{2} (15.15 sq mi)
- Elevation: 100 m (330 ft)
- Population (2021-12-01): 2,101
  - Density: 53.56/km^{2} (138.7/sq mi)
- Time zone: UTC+02:00 (EET)
  - Summer (DST): UTC+03:00 (EEST)
- Postal code: 207515
- Area code: +(40) 251
- Vehicle reg.: DJ
- Website: primariascaesti.ro

Scăești is a commune in Dolj County, Oltenia, Romania with a population of 2,101 people as of 2021. It is composed of two villages, Scaești and Valea lui Pătru.
