= Piscu Vechi =

- Commune
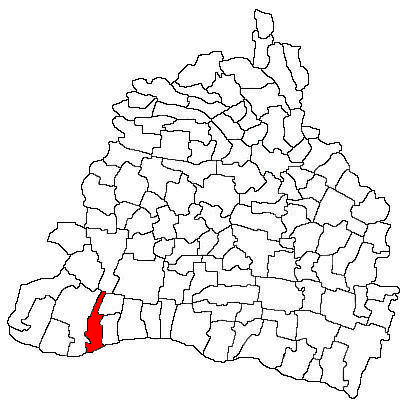
- Location in Dolj County

- Location in Romania
- Coordinates: 43°54′N 23°10′E
- Country: Romania
- County: Dolj
- Area: 28.15 km^{2} (10.87 sq mi)
- Elevation: 37 m (121 ft)
- Population (2021-12-01): 2,370
  - Density: 84/km^{2} (220/sq mi)
- Time zone: EET/EEST (UTC+2/+3)
- Postal code: 207010
- Vehicle reg.: DJ

Piscu Vechi is a commune in Dolj County, Oltenia, Romania with a population of 2,950 people. It is composed of two villages, Piscu Vechi and Pisculeț. It also included the village of Ghidici until 2004, when it was split off to form a separate commune.
