= Stadionul Unirea =

There are several stadiums in Romania with the name Stadionul Unirea:

- Stadionul Unirea (Dej)
- Stadionul Unirea (Sânnicolau Mare)
- Stadionul Unirea (Tărlungeni)
