= Ciupercenii Noi =

- Commune
- Location in Romania
- Coordinates: 43°55′N 22°57′E
- Country: Romania
- County: Dolj
- Area: 64 km^{2} (25 sq mi)
- Population (2021-12-01): 5,003
  - Density: 78/km^{2} (200/sq mi)
- Time zone: UTC+02:00 (EET)
  - Summer (DST): UTC+03:00 (EEST)
- Vehicle reg.: DJ

Ciupercenii Noi is a commune in Dolj County, Oltenia, Romania with a population of 5,899 people. It is composed of two villages, Ciupercenii Noi and Smârdan.
