= Siliștea Crucii =

- Commune
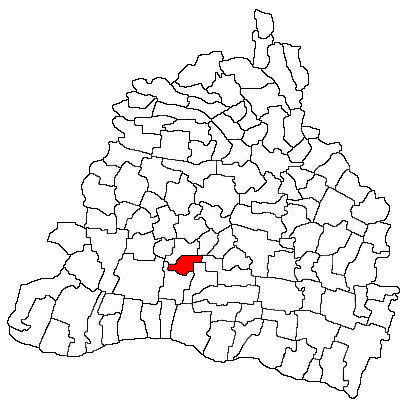
- Location in Dolj County

- Location in Romania
- Coordinates: 44°2′N 23°29′E
- Country: Romania
- County: Dolj

Government
  - Mayor (2024–2028): Laurențiu-Adrian Sandu (PNL)
- Area: 34.79 km^{2} (13.43 sq mi)
- Elevation: 58 m (190 ft)
- Population (2021-12-01): 1,248
  - Density: 35.87/km^{2} (92.91/sq mi)
- Time zone: UTC+02:00 (EET)
  - Summer (DST): UTC+03:00 (EEST)
- Postal code: 207535
- Area code: +(40) 251
- Vehicle reg.: DJ
- Website: www.comunasilisteacrucii.ro

Siliștea Crucii is a commune in Dolj County, Oltenia, Romania with a population of 1,248 people as of 2021. It is composed of a single village, Siliștea Crucii.
