= Argetoaia =

- Commune
- Location in Romania
- Coordinates: 44°31′N 23°22′E
- Country: Romania
- County: Dolj

Government
  - Mayor (2024–2028): Mircea Beznă (PSD)
- Area: 54.88 km^{2} (21.19 sq mi)
- Elevation: 169 m (554 ft)
- Population (2021-12-01): 4,331
  - Density: 79/km^{2} (200/sq mi)
- Time zone: EET/EEST (UTC+2/+3)
- Postal code: 207035
- Area code: +(40) 251
- Vehicle reg.: DJ
- Website: primaria-argetoaia.ro

Argetoaia is a commune in Dolj County, Oltenia, Romania with a population of 4,331 people as of 2021. It is composed of twelve villages: Argetoaia, Băranu, Berbeșu, Iordăchești, Leordoasa, Malumnic, Novac, Piria, Poiana Fântânii, Salcia, Teascu din Deal, and Ursoaia.
