= Almăj =

- Commune
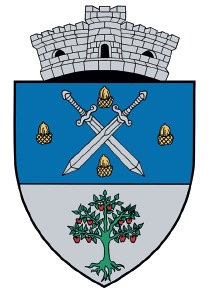
- Coat of arms

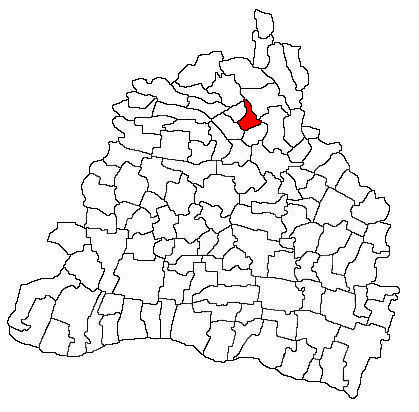
- Location in Dolj County

- Location in Romania
- Coordinates: 44°27′N 23°42′E
- Country: Romania
- County: Dolj

Government
  - Mayor (2024–2028): Alin-Mădălin Gorjan (PSD)
- Area: 28.02 km^{2} (10.82 sq mi)
- Elevation: 124 m (407 ft)
- Population (2021-12-01): 1,792
  - Density: 64/km^{2} (170/sq mi)
- Time zone: EET/EEST (UTC+2/+3)
- Postal code: 207010
- Area code: +(40) 251
- Vehicle reg.: DJ
- Website: primariaalmaj.ro

Almăj is a commune in Dolj County, Oltenia, Romania with a population of 1,792 people as of 2021. It is composed of four villages: Almăj, Bogea, Moșneni, and Șitoaia. It also included Beharca and Coțofenii din Față villages until 2004, when they were split off to form Coțofenii din Față Commune.

The commune is located in the northern part of the county and belongs to the Craiova metropolitan area.
