= Vârtop =

- Commune
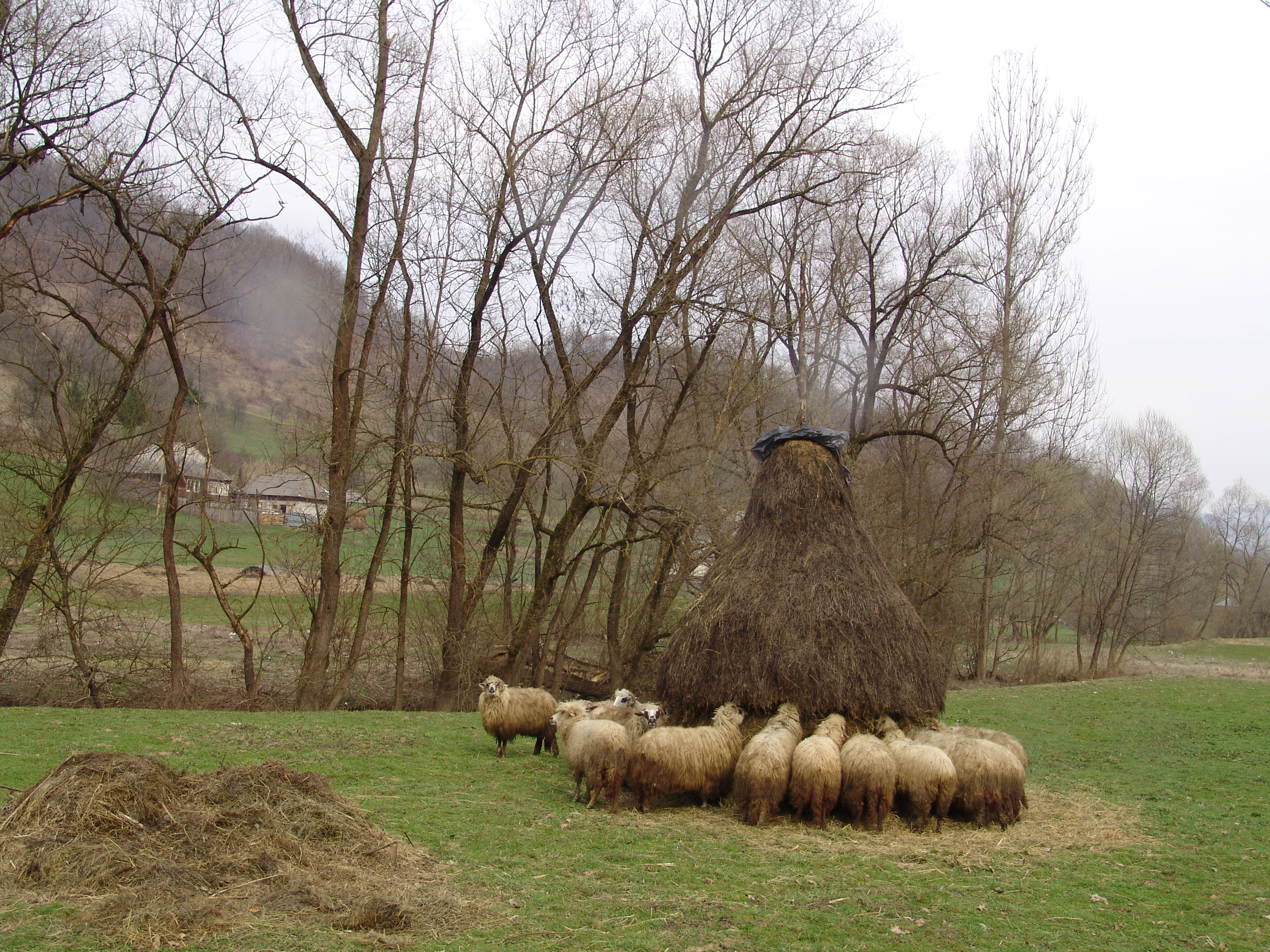

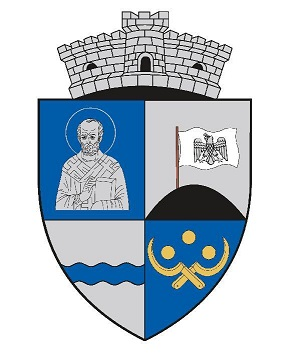
- Coat of arms

- Location in Romania
- Coordinates: 44°13′N 23°21′E
- Country: Romania
- County: Dolj
- Area: 32.19 km^{2} (12.43 sq mi)
- Population (2021-12-01): 1,666
  - Density: 51.76/km^{2} (134.0/sq mi)
- Time zone: UTC+02:00 (EET)
  - Summer (DST): UTC+03:00 (EEST)
- Vehicle reg.: DJ

Vârtop is a commune in Dolj County, Oltenia, Romania with a population of 1,850 people. It is composed of a single village, Vârtop.
