= Teasc =

- Commune
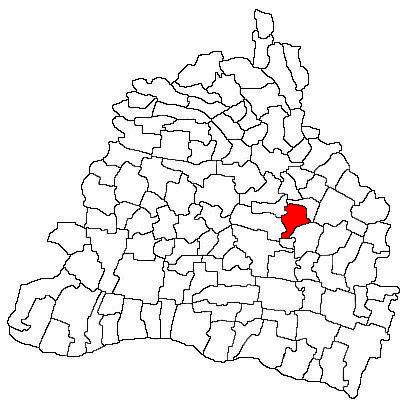
- Location in Dolj County

- Location in Romania
- Coordinates: 44°09′36″N 23°52′01″E
- Country: Romania
- County: Dolj

Government
  - Mayor (2024–2028): Romeo Voicinovschi (PSD)
- Area: 40.21 km^{2} (15.53 sq mi)
- Elevation: 67 m (220 ft)
- Population (2021-12-01): 3,059
  - Density: 76.08/km^{2} (197.0/sq mi)
- Time zone: UTC+02:00 (EET)
  - Summer (DST): UTC+03:00 (EEST)
- Postal code: 207570
- Area code: +(40) 251
- Vehicle reg.: DJ

Teasc is a commune in Dolj County, Oltenia, Romania with a population of 3,059 people as of 2021. It is composed of two villages, Secui and Teasc.

The commune is situated in the Wallachian Plain, on the left bank of the Jiu River. It is located in the central part of Dolj County, 22 km (14 mi) south of the county seat, Craiova, to which it is connected by the national road DN55.
