= Unirea National College =

Unirea National College (Romanian: Colegiul Naţional "Unirea") may refer to one of three educational institutions in Romania:

- Unirea National College (Braşov)
- Unirea National College (Focşani)
