= Măceșu de Jos =

- Commune
- Location in Romania
- Coordinates: 43°53′N 23°43′E
- Country: Romania
- County: Dolj
- Area: 57.43 km^{2} (22.17 sq mi)
- Population (2021-12-01): 1,172
  - Density: 20.41/km^{2} (52.86/sq mi)
- Time zone: UTC+02:00 (EET)
  - Summer (DST): UTC+03:00 (EEST)
- Vehicle reg.: DJ

Măceșu de Jos is a commune in Dolj County, Oltenia, Romania with a population of 1,673 people. It is composed of two villages, Măceșu de Jos and Săpata.
