= Coțofenii din Dos =

- Commune
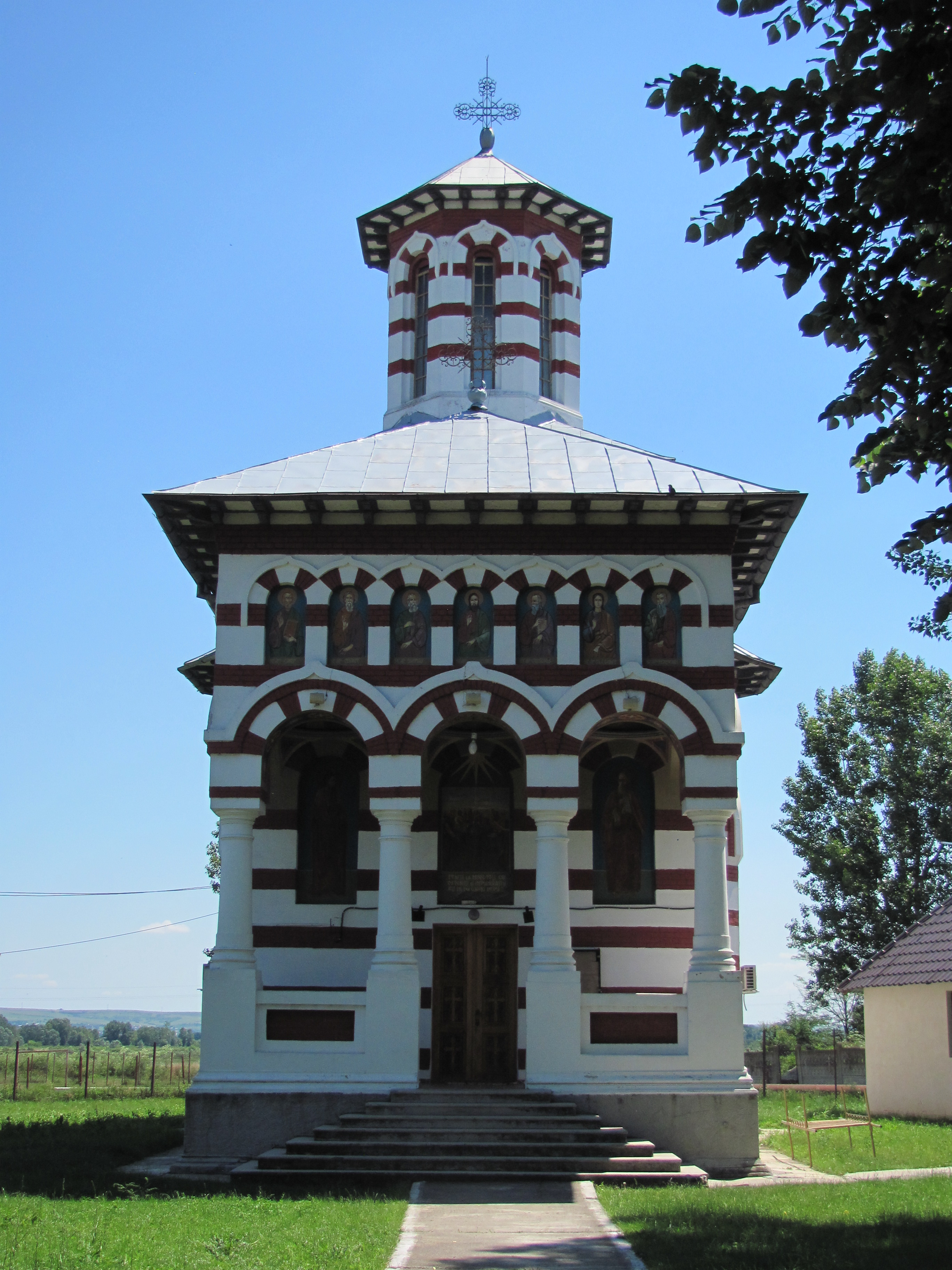
- Orthodox church of Coțofenii din Dos

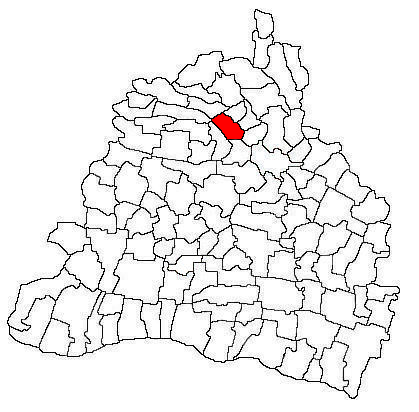
- Location in Dolj County

- Location in Romania
- Coordinates: 44°26′N 23°37′E
- Country: Romania
- County: Dolj
- Population (2021-12-01): 2,191
- Time zone: UTC+02:00 (EET)
  - Summer (DST): UTC+03:00 (EEST)
- Vehicle reg.: DJ

Coțofenii din Dos is a commune in Dolj County, Oltenia, Romania with a population of 2,573 people. It is composed of three villages: Coțofenii din Dos, Mihăița and Potmelțu.
