= Malu Mare =

- Commune
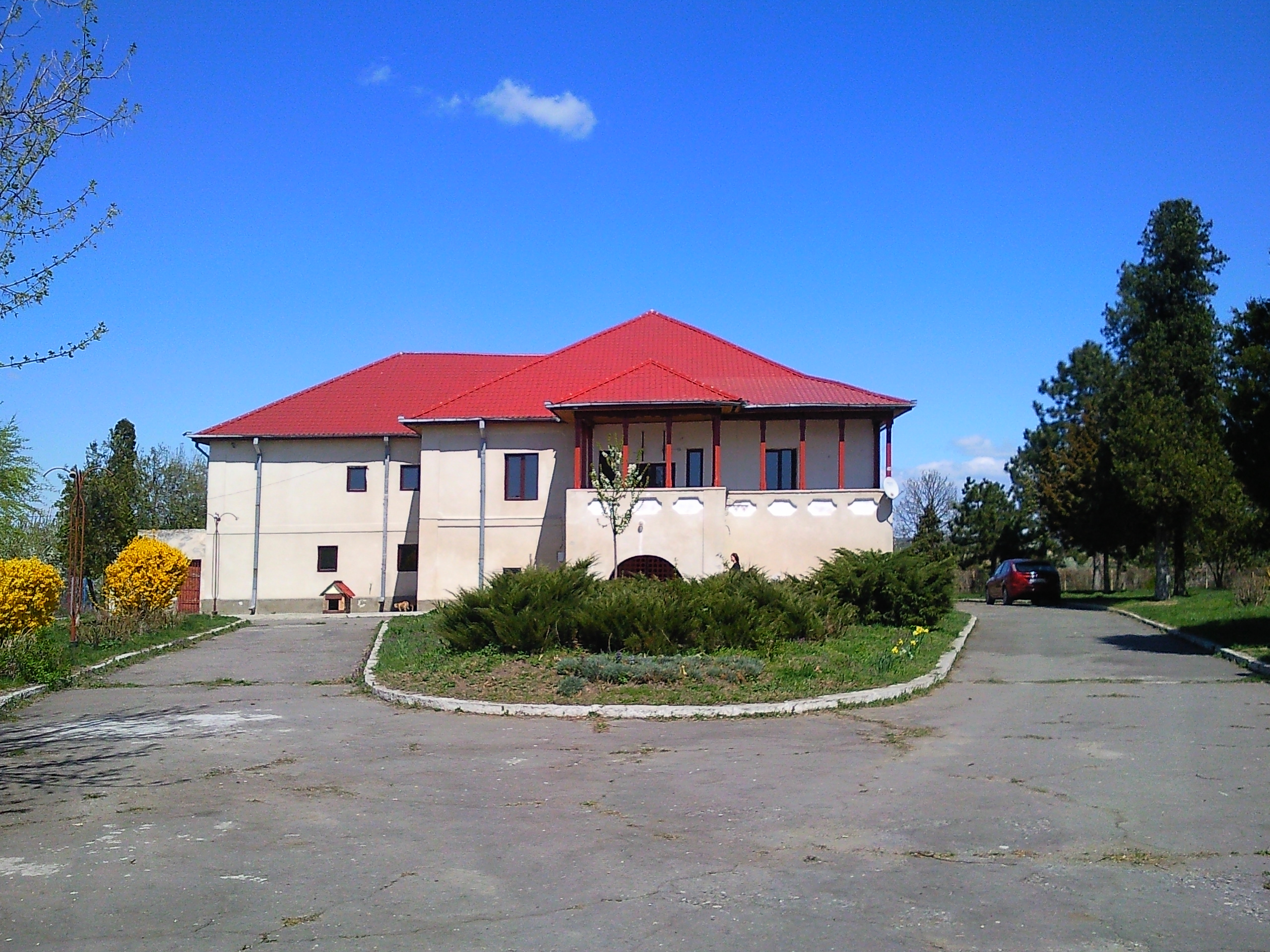
- Stan Jianu manor in Preajba

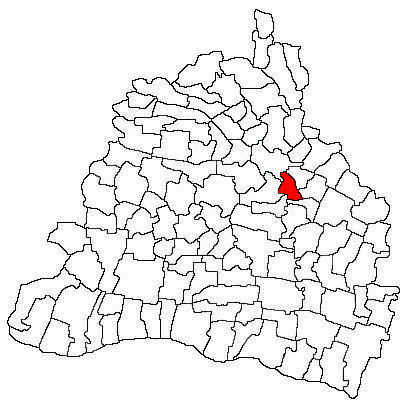
- Location in Dolj County

- Location in Romania
- Coordinates: 44°14′N 23°52′E
- Country: Romania
- County: Dolj

Government
  - Mayor (2024–2028): Ion Spătărelu (PSD)
- Area: 24.49 km^{2} (9.46 sq mi)
- Elevation: 90 m (300 ft)
- Population (2021-12-01): 7,548
  - Density: 308.2/km^{2} (798.3/sq mi)
- Time zone: UTC+02:00 (EET)
  - Summer (DST): UTC+03:00 (EEST)
- Postal code: 207365
- Area code: +(40) 251
- Vehicle reg.: DJ
- Website: www.primariamalumare.ro

Malu Mare is a commune in Dolj County, Oltenia, Romania with a population of 7,548 people as of 2021. It is composed of two villages, Malu Mare and Preajba. It also included the village of Ghindeni until 2004, when it was split off to form a separate commune.

The commune is situated in the Wallachian Plain, at an altitude of 90 m (300 ft), on the left bank of the Jiu River. It is located in the central part of Dolj County, 12 km (7.5 mi) southeast of the county seat, Craiova, and is part of the Craiova metropolitan area.

Malu Mare is crossed north to south by the national road DN55, which starts in Craiova and ends in Bechet, a port town on the Danube. The Malu Mare train station serves the CFR Main Line 900, which connects the capital city, Bucharest, to Craiova and Timișoara.

== Natives ==
- Valeriu Butulescu (born 1953), writer

== See also ==
- Malu Mare oil field
