= Brabova =

- Commune
- Location in Romania
- Coordinates: 44°22′N 23°26′E
- Country: Romania
- County: Dolj

Government
  - Mayor (2024–2028): Ionel Moțoiag (PSD)
- Area: 79.65 km^{2} (30.75 sq mi)
- Elevation: 139 m (456 ft)
- Population (2021-12-01): 1,418
  - Density: 17.80/km^{2} (46.11/sq mi)
- Time zone: UTC+02:00 (EET)
  - Summer (DST): UTC+03:00 (EEST)
- Postal code: 207075
- Area code: +(40) 251
- Vehicle reg.: DJ
- Website: www.primariabrabova.ro

Brabova is a commune in Dolj County, Oltenia, Romania with a population of 1,418 as of 2021. It is composed of six villages: Brabova, Caraiman, Mosna, Răchita de Jos, Urdinița, and Voita.
