= Terpezița =

- Commune
- Location in Romania
- Coordinates: 44°17′N 23°31′E
- Country: Romania
- County: Dolj

Government
  - Mayor (2021–2024): Virgil-Daniel Gruia
- Area: 66.84 km^{2} (25.81 sq mi)
- Population (2021-12-01): 1,360
  - Density: 20.3/km^{2} (52.7/sq mi)
- Time zone: UTC+02:00 (EET)
  - Summer (DST): UTC+03:00 (EEST)
- Vehicle reg.: DJ

Terpezița is a commune in Dolj County, Oltenia, Romania with a population of 1,920 people. It is composed of five villages: Căciulatu, Căruia, Floran, Lazu and Terpezița.
