= Galicea Mare =

- Commune
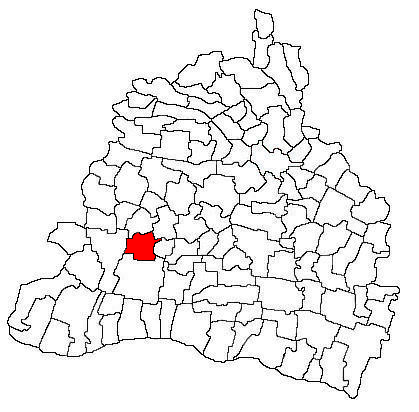
- Location in Dolj County

- Location in Romania
- Coordinates: 44°6′N 23°18′E
- Country: Romania
- County: Dolj
- Population (2021-12-01): 3,962
- Time zone: EET/EEST (UTC+2/+3)
- Vehicle reg.: DJ

Galicea Mare is a commune in Dolj County, Oltenia, Romania with a population of 4,950 people. It is composed of a single village, Galicea Mare.
