= Seaca de Pădure =

- Commune
- Location in Romania
- Coordinates: 44°22′N 23°18′E
- Country: Romania
- County: Dolj

Government
  - Mayor (2024–2028): Săndică Osiac (PSD)
- Area: 57.37 km^{2} (22.15 sq mi)
- Elevation: 207 m (679 ft)
- Population (2021-12-01): 781
  - Density: 13.6/km^{2} (35.3/sq mi)
- Time zone: UTC+02:00 (EET)
  - Summer (DST): UTC+03:00 (EEST)
- Postal code: 207525
- Area code: +(40) 251
- Vehicle reg.: DJ
- Website: primariacomuneiseacadepadure.ro

Seaca de Pădure is a commune in Dolj County, Oltenia, Romania with a population of 781 people as of 2021. It is composed of three villages: Răchita de Sus, Seaca de Pădure, and Veleni.
