= Dobrotești, Dolj =

Dobrotești
- Commune
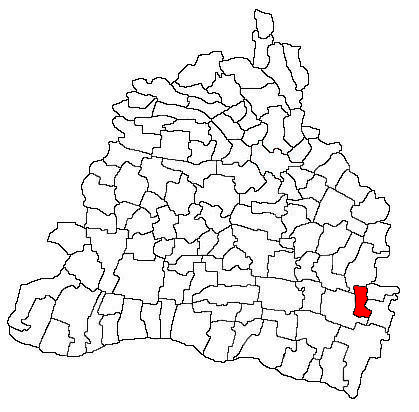
- Location in Dolj County

- Location in Romania
- Coordinates: 43.9528°N 24.1212°E
- Country: Romania
- County: Dolj
- Area: 33.64 km^{2} (12.99 sq mi)
- Population (2021-12-01): 1,406
  - Density: 41.80/km^{2} (108.2/sq mi)
- Time zone: UTC+02:00 (EET)
  - Summer (DST): UTC+03:00 (EEST)
- Vehicle reg.: DJ

Dobrotești is a commune in Dolj County, Oltenia, Romania with a population of 3,288 people. It is composed of two villages, Dobrotești and Nisipuri. These were part of Amărăștii de Sus Commune until 2004, when they were split off.
