= Coțofenii din Față =

- Commune
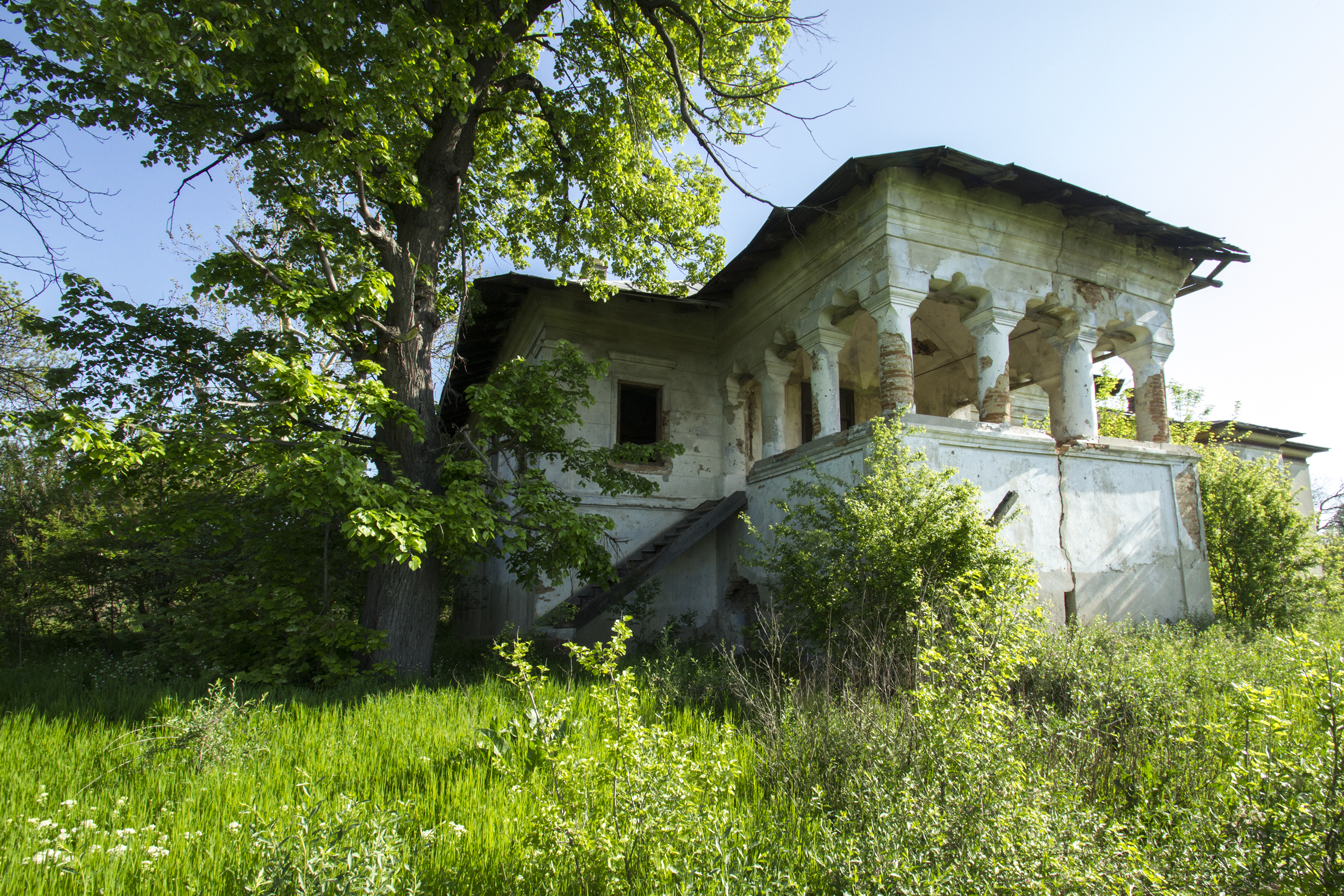
- Coțofenilor Manor

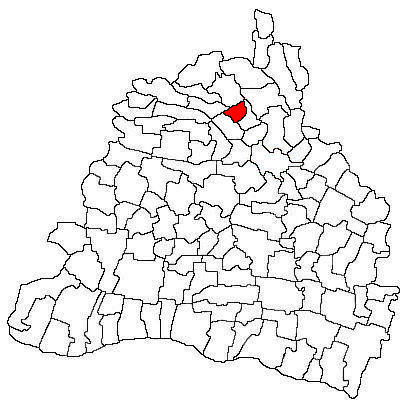
- Location in Dolj County

- Location in Romania
- Coordinates: 44°27′N 23°40′E
- Country: Romania
- County: Dolj

Government
  - Mayor (2020–2024): Daniel Claudiu Ceocea (PSD)
- Area: 23.60 km^{2} (9.11 sq mi)
- Elevation: 112 m (367 ft)
- Population (2021-12-01): 2,121
  - Density: 89.87/km^{2} (232.8/sq mi)
- Time zone: UTC+02:00 (EET)
  - Summer (DST): UTC+03:00 (EEST)
- Postal code: 207010
- Vehicle reg.: DJ
- Website: primaria-cotofeniidinfata.ro/wp

Coțofenii din Față is a commune in Dolj County, Oltenia, Romania with a population of 1,904 people. It is composed of two villages, Beharca, and Coțofenii din Față. These were part of Almăj Commune until 2004, when they were split off.

The commune is located in the northern part of the county and belongs to the Craiova metropolitan area.
