= Negoi =

- Commune
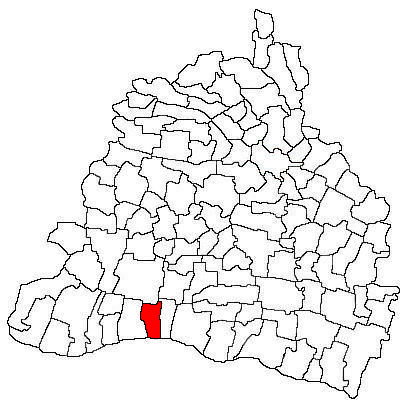
- Location in Dolj County

- Location in Romania
- Coordinates: 43°55′N 23°22′E
- Country: Romania
- County: Dolj
- Area: 50.39 km^{2} (19.46 sq mi)
- Population (2021-12-01): 2,298
  - Density: 45.60/km^{2} (118.1/sq mi)
- Time zone: UTC+02:00 (EET)
  - Summer (DST): UTC+03:00 (EEST)
- Vehicle reg.: DJ

Negoi is a commune in Dolj County, Oltenia, Romania with a population of 4,286 people. It is composed of a single village, Negoi. It also included Catane and Catanele Noi villages until 2004, when they were split off to form Catane Commune.
