= Verbița =

- Commune
- Location in Romania
- Coordinates: 44°18′N 23°10′E
- Country: Romania
- County: Dolj
- Area: 46.15 km^{2} (17.82 sq mi)
- Population (2021-12-01): 1,056
  - Density: 22.88/km^{2} (59.26/sq mi)
- Time zone: UTC+02:00 (EET)
  - Summer (DST): UTC+03:00 (EEST)
- Vehicle reg.: DJ

Verbița is a commune in Dolj County, Oltenia, Romania with a population of 1,056 as of 2021. It is composed of two villages, Verbicioara and Verbița.

== Natives ==
- Gita Luka (1921 – 2001), Israeli actress, comedian, and singer
