= Unirea, Dolj =

Unirea
- Commune
- Location in Romania
- Coordinates: 44°10′N 23°11′E
- Country: Romania
- County: Dolj
- Area: 48.72 km^{2} (18.81 sq mi)
- Population (2021-12-01): 3,350
  - Density: 68.8/km^{2} (178/sq mi)
- Time zone: UTC+02:00 (EET)
  - Summer (DST): UTC+03:00 (EEST)
- Vehicle reg.: DJ

Unirea is a commune in Dolj County, Oltenia, Romania with a population of 4,620 people. It is composed of a single village, Unirea.
