= Catane =

- Commune
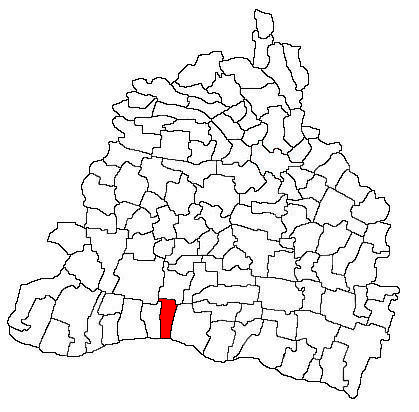
- Location in Dolj County

- Location in Romania
- Coordinates: 43°56′N 23°25′E
- Country: Romania
- County: Dolj

Government
  - Mayor (2021–2024): Gheorghe Mărgărit
- Area: 46.59 km^{2} (17.99 sq mi)
- Population (2021-12-01): 1,959
  - Density: 42.05/km^{2} (108.9/sq mi)
- Time zone: UTC+02:00 (EET)
  - Summer (DST): UTC+03:00 (EEST)
- Vehicle reg.: DJ

Catane is a commune in Dolj County, Oltenia, Romania with a population of 2,010 people. It is composed of two villages, Catane and Catanele Noi. These were part of Negoi Commune until 2004, when they were split off.
