= Breasta =

- Commune
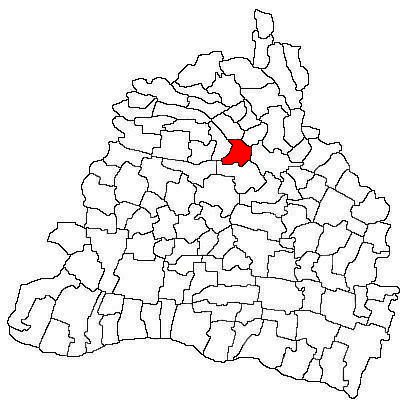
- Location in Dolj County

- Location in Romania
- Coordinates: 44°20′N 23°41′E
- Country: Romania
- County: Dolj

Government
  - Mayor (2024–2028): Ion Vizitiu (PSD)
- Area: 45.2 km^{2} (17.5 sq mi)
- Elevation: 82 m (269 ft)
- Population (2021-12-01): 4,201
  - Density: 92.9/km^{2} (241/sq mi)
- Time zone: UTC+02:00 (EET)
  - Summer (DST): UTC+03:00 (EEST)
- Postal code: 207115
- Area code: +(40) 251
- Vehicle reg.: DJ
- Website: primariabreasta.ro

Breasta is a commune in Dolj County, Oltenia, Romania with a population of 4,201 as of 2021. It is composed of seven villages: Breasta, Cotu, Crovna, Făget, Obedin, Roșieni, and Valea Lungului.
