= Sopot, Dolj =

Sopot
- Commune
- Location in Romania
- Coordinates: 44°25′N 23°30′E
- Country: Romania
- County: Dolj

Government
  - Mayor (2020–2024): Ion-Cătălin Trăistaru (PSD)
- Area: 55.43 km^{2} (21.40 sq mi)
- Elevation: 135 m (443 ft)
- Population (2021-12-01): 1,646
  - Density: 29.70/km^{2} (76.91/sq mi)
- Time zone: UTC+02:00 (EET)
  - Summer (DST): UTC+03:00 (EEST)
- Postal code: 207540
- Vehicle reg.: DJ
- Website: www.primaria-sopot.ro

Sopot is a commune in Dolj County, Oltenia, Romania with a population of 1,646 people as of 2021. It is composed of seven villages: Bașcov, Beloț, Cernat, Pereni, Pietroaia, Sârsca, and Sopot.
