= Caraula =

- Commune
- Location in Romania
- Coordinates: 44°11′N 23°15′E
- Country: Romania
- County: Dolj
- Area: 35.9 km^{2} (13.9 sq mi)
- Population (2021-12-01): 2,276
  - Density: 63.4/km^{2} (164/sq mi)
- Time zone: UTC+02:00 (EET)
  - Summer (DST): UTC+03:00 (EEST)
- Vehicle reg.: DJ

Caraula is a commune in Dolj County, Oltenia, Romania with a population of 2,560 people. It is composed of a single village, Caraula.
