= Seaca de Câmp =

- Commune
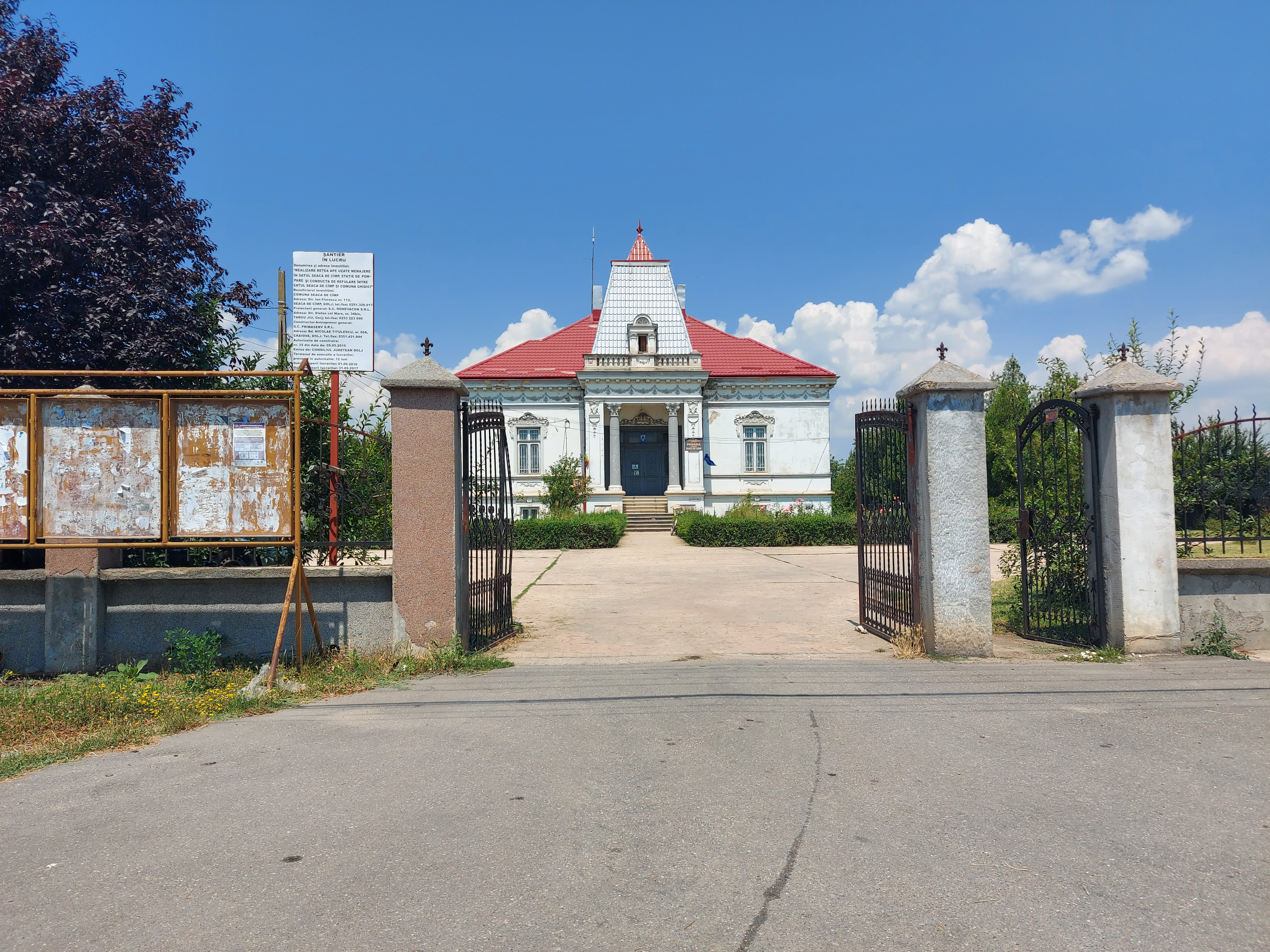
- Seaca de Câmp town hall

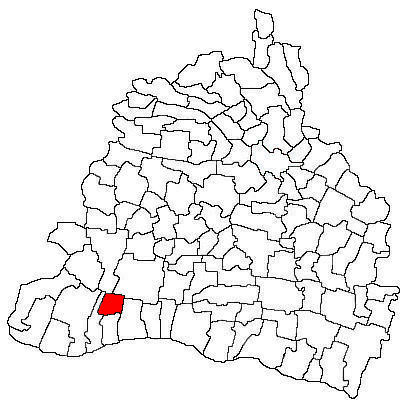
- Location in Dolj County

- Location in Romania
- Coordinates: 43°56′N 23°13′E
- Country: Romania
- County: Dolj

Government
  - Mayor (2020–2024): Iulică Băloi (PNL)
- Area: 43.15 km^{2} (16.66 sq mi)
- Elevation: 42 m (138 ft)
- Population (2021-12-01): 1,631
  - Density: 37.80/km^{2} (97.90/sq mi)
- Time zone: UTC+02:00 (EET)
  - Summer (DST): UTC+03:00 (EEST)
- Postal code: 207520
- Area code: +(40) 251
- Vehicle reg.: DJ
- Website: primariaseacadecamp.ro

Seaca de Câmp is a commune in Dolj County, Oltenia, Romania with a population of 1,631 people as of 2021. It is composed of two villages, Piscu Nou and Seaca de Câmp.
