= Orodel =

- Commune
- Location in Romania
- Coordinates: 44°14′N 23°14′E
- Country: Romania
- County: Dolj
- Population (2021-12-01): 2,147
- Time zone: UTC+02:00 (EET)
  - Summer (DST): UTC+03:00 (EEST)
- Vehicle reg.: DJ

Orodel is a commune in Dolj County, Oltenia, Romania with a population of 2,147 people as of 2021. It is composed of five villages: Bechet, Călugărei, Cornu, Orodel, and Teiu.

== Natives ==
- Sorin Cârțu (born 1955), football player and coach
- Ilie G. Murgulescu (1902 – 1991), physical chemist and communist politician
- Nuța Olaru (born 1970), female long-distance runner
- Victor Pițurcă (born 1956), football player and manager
- Eugen Neagoe
