= Afumați, Dolj =

Afumați
- Commune
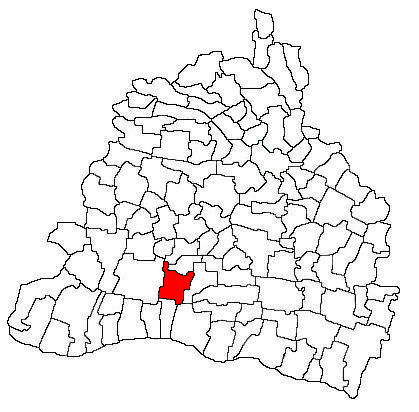
- Location in Dolj County

- Location in Romania
- Coordinates: 44.00°N 23.47°E
- Country: Romania
- County: Dolj

Government
  - Mayor (2024–2028): Dumitrel-Titel Stoenescu (PSD)
- Area: 60.43 km^{2} (23.33 sq mi)
- Elevation: 54 m (177 ft)
- Population (2021-12-01): 2,646
  - Density: 44/km^{2} (110/sq mi)
- Time zone: EET/EEST (UTC+2/+3)
- Postal code: 207005
- Area code: +(40) 251
- Vehicle reg.: DJ
- Website: www.primaria-afumati-dolj.ro

Afumați is a commune in Dolj County, Oltenia, Romania with a population of 2,646 people as of 2021. It is composed of three villages: Afumați, Boureni, and Covei.
