= Dolj County =

County of Romania

Dolj County Județul Dolj
- County
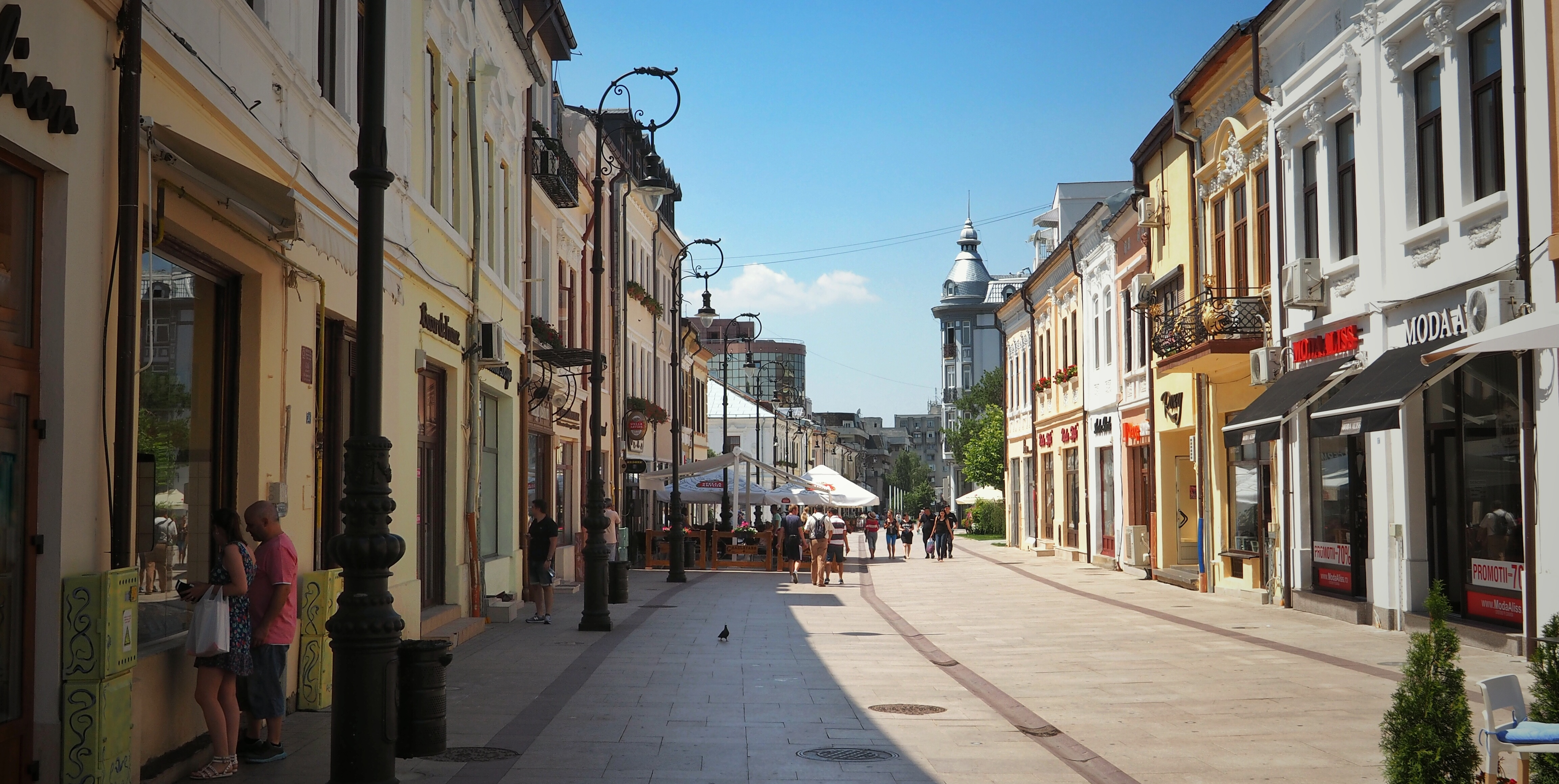
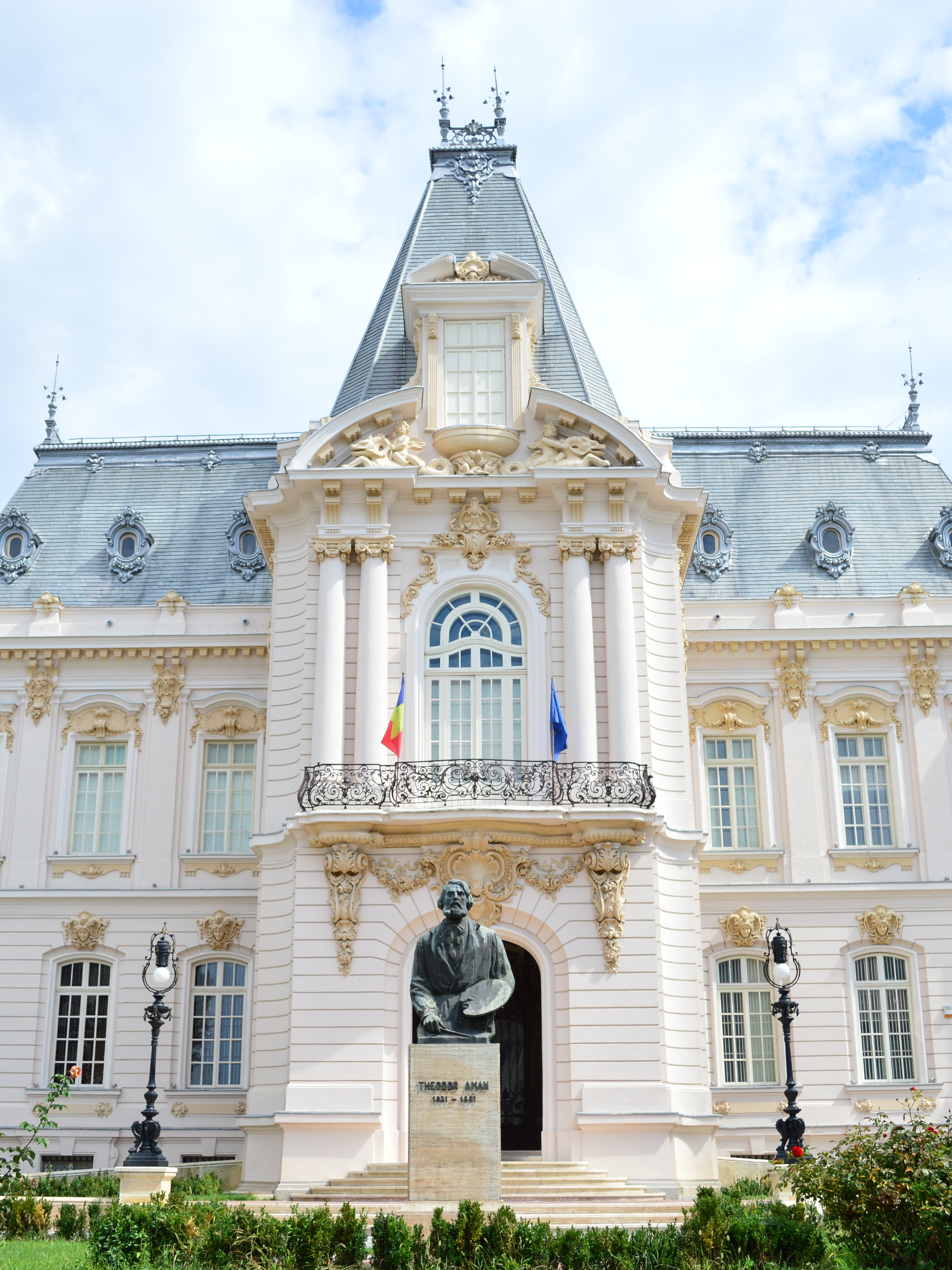
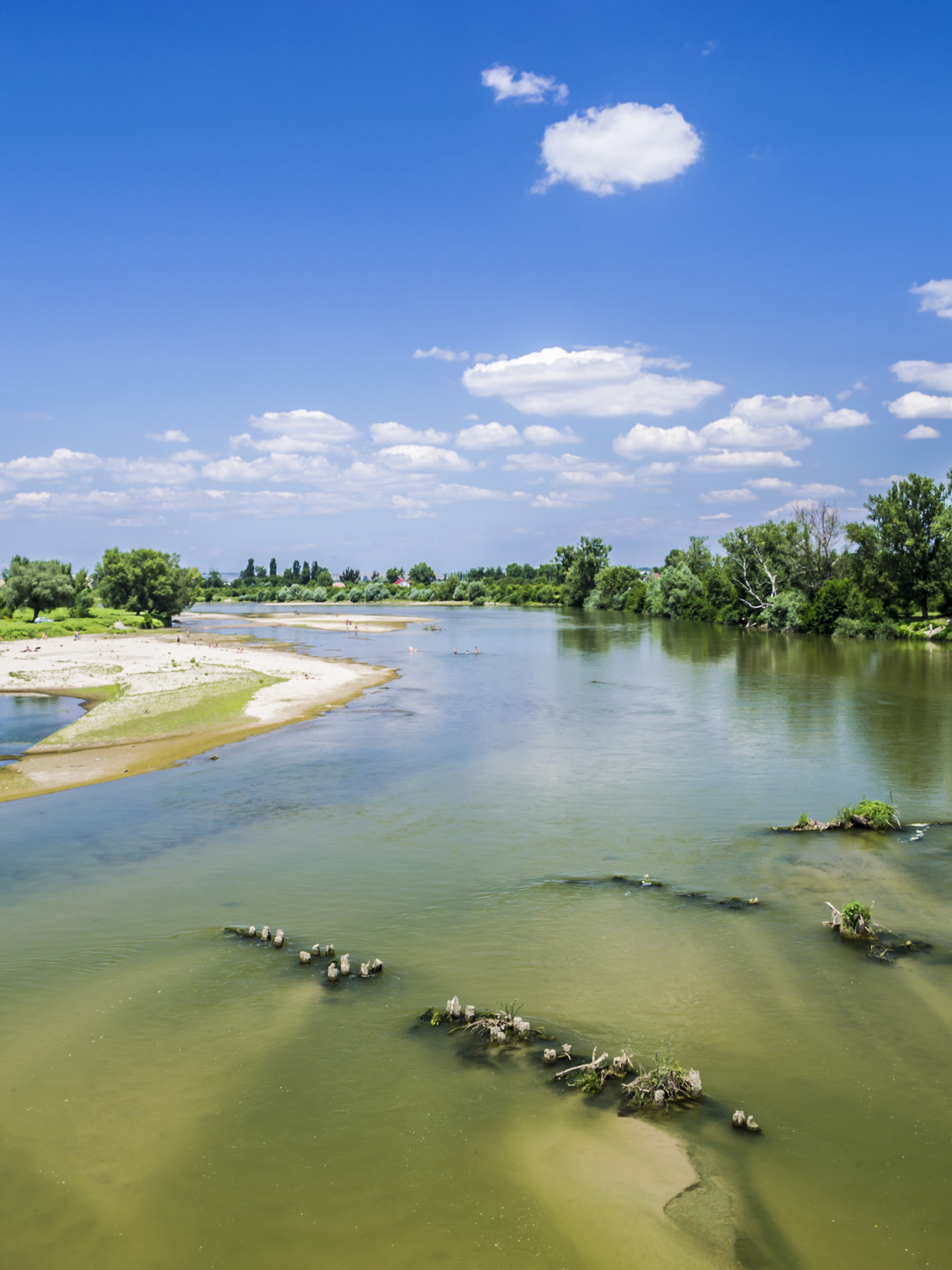
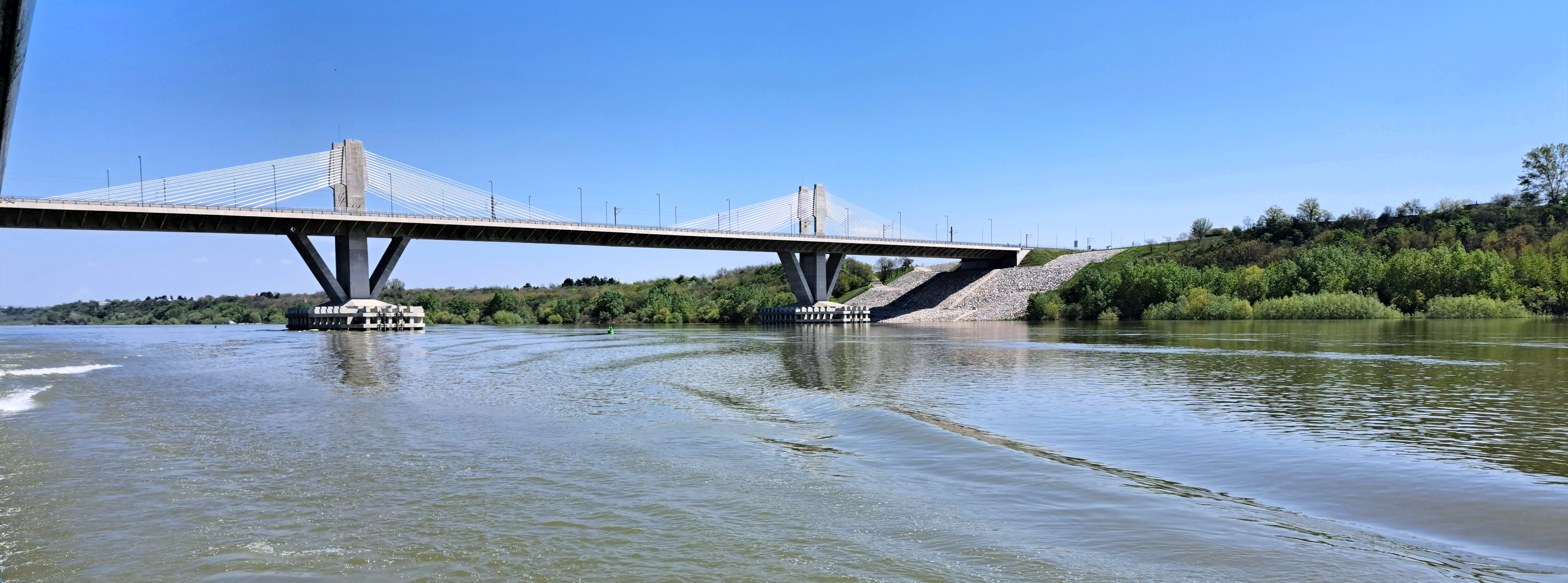
- Lipscani Street, Craiova Craiova Art Museum Jiu River New Europe Bridge over the Danube

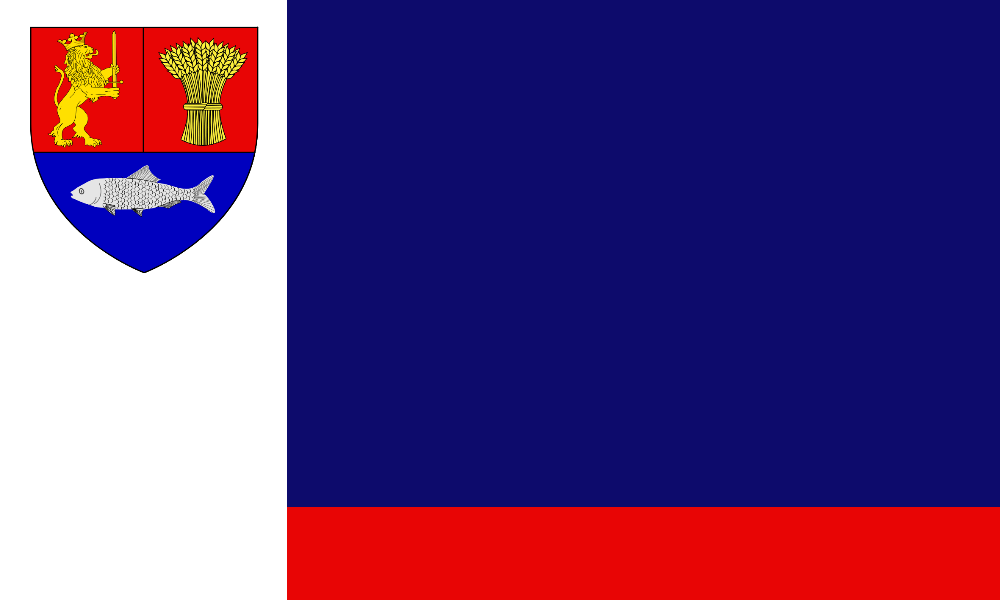
- Flag Coat of arms

- Coordinates: 44.17°N 23.7°E
- Country: Romania
- Development region^{1}: Sud-Vest
- Historic region: Oltenia
- Capital city: Craiova

Government
  - Type: County Council
  - President of the County Council: Vasile Dorin-Cosmin
  - Prefect^{2}: Dan Diaconu

Area
  - Total: 7,414 km^{2} (2,863 sq mi)
  - Rank: 7th in Romania

Population (2021-12-01)
  - Total: 599,442
  - Rank: 7th in Romania
  - Density: 80.85/km^{2} (209.4/sq mi)
- Time zone: UTC+2 (EET)
  - Summer (DST): UTC+3 (EEST)
- Postal Code: 20wxyz^{3}
- Area code: +40 x51^{4}
- ISO 3166 code: RO-DJ
- Car Plates: DJ^{5}
- GDP nominal: US$9.400 billion (2024)
- GDP per capita: US$6,512 (2015)
- Website: County Council; County Prefecture
- ^{1} The development regions of Romania have no administrative role and were formed in order to manage funds from the European Union^{2} as of 2007, the Prefect is not a politician, but a public functionary. He (or she) is not allowed to be a member of a political party, and is banned from having any political activity in the first six months after his resignation (or exclusion) from the public functionaries' corps.^{3}w, x, y, and z are digits that indicate the city, the street, part of the street, or even the building of the address^{4}x is a digit indicating the operator: 2 for the former national operator, Romtelecom, and 3 for the other ground telephone networks^{5}used on both the plates of the vehicles that operate only in the county limits (like utility vehicles, ATVs, etc.), and the ones used outside the county

Dolj County (Romanian pronunciation: [dolʒ]; originally meant Dol(no)-Jiu, "lower Jiu", as opposed to Gorj (upper Jiu)) is a county (județ) of Romania on the border with Bulgaria, in Oltenia, with the capital city at Craiova.

== Demographics ==
In 2011, the county had a population of 660,544 and a population density of 89/km^{2} (230/sq mi).

- Romanians – over 95.5%
- Roma – 4.3%
- Unknown - 0.2%

Year	County population
1948	615,301
1956	642,028 ▲
1966	691,116 ▲
1977	750,328 ▲
1992	761,074 ▲
2002	734,231 ▼
2011	660,544 ▼
2021	599,442 ▼

== Geography ==
This county has a total area of 7,414 km^{2} (2,863 sq mi).

The entire area is a plain with the Danube on the south forming a wide valley crossed by the Jiu River in the middle. Other small rivers flow through the county, each one forming a small valley. There are some lakes across the county and many ponds and channels in the Danube valley. 6% of the county's area is a desert.

=== Neighbours ===
- Olt County to the east.
- Mehedinți County to the west.
- Gorj County and Vâlcea County to the north.
- Bulgaria – Vidin Province to the southwest, Montana and Vratsa provinces to the south.

== Economy ==
Agriculture is the county's main industry. The county has a land that is ideal for growing cereals, vegetables, and wines. Other industries are mainly located in the city of Craiova, the largest city in southwestern Romania.

The county's main industries:

- Automotive industry – Ford has a factory.
- Heavy electrical and transport equipment – Electroputere Craiova is the largest factory plant in Romania.
- Aeronautics
- Chemicals processing
- Foods and beverages
- Textiles
- Mechanical parts and components

There are two small ports on the shore of the Danube river – Bechet and Calafat.

== People ==
- Corneliu Baba
- Tudor Gheorghe
- Mircea Mihail Ghiorghiu
- Alexandru Macedonski
- Titu Maiorescu
- Amza Pellea
- Gheorghe Popescu
- Doina Ruști
- Francisc Șirato
- Marin Sorescu
- Nicolae Titulescu
- Ion Țuculescu
- Nicolae Vasilescu-Karpen
- Mihai Viteazul

== Tourism ==
Major tourist attractions:

- The city of Craiova;
- The city of Calafat;
- Fishing on the Danube;
- The city of Băilești.

== Politics ==
The Dolj County Council, renewed at the 2024 local elections, consists of 36 councilors, with the following party composition:

Party	Seats	Current County Council
Social Democratic Party (PSD)	21	
National Liberal Party (PNL)	9	
Alliance for the Union of Romanians (AUR)	3	
Save Romania Union (USR)	1	
People's Movement Party (PMP)	1	
Force of the Right (FD)	1	

== Administrative divisions ==
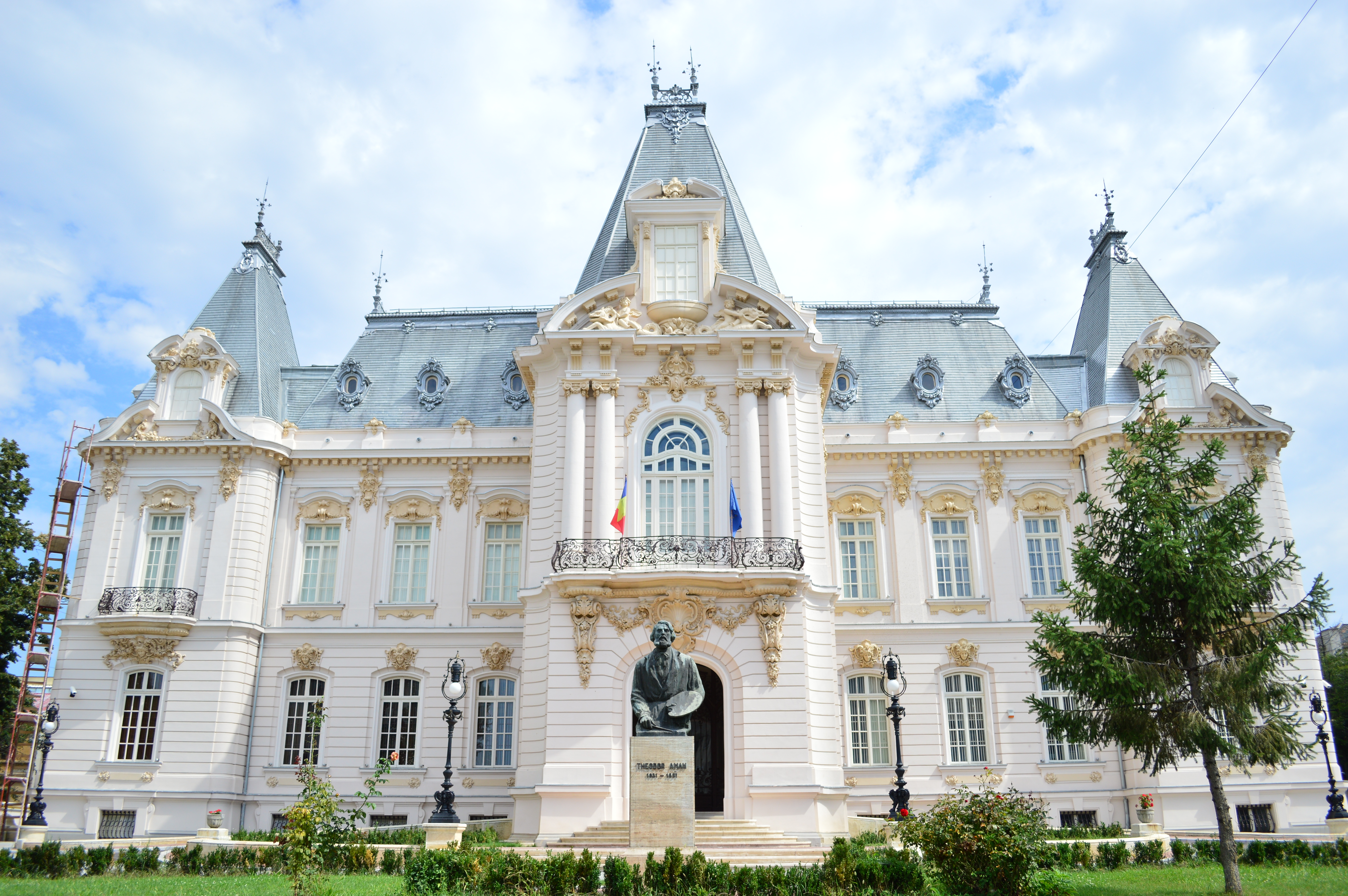
Craiova

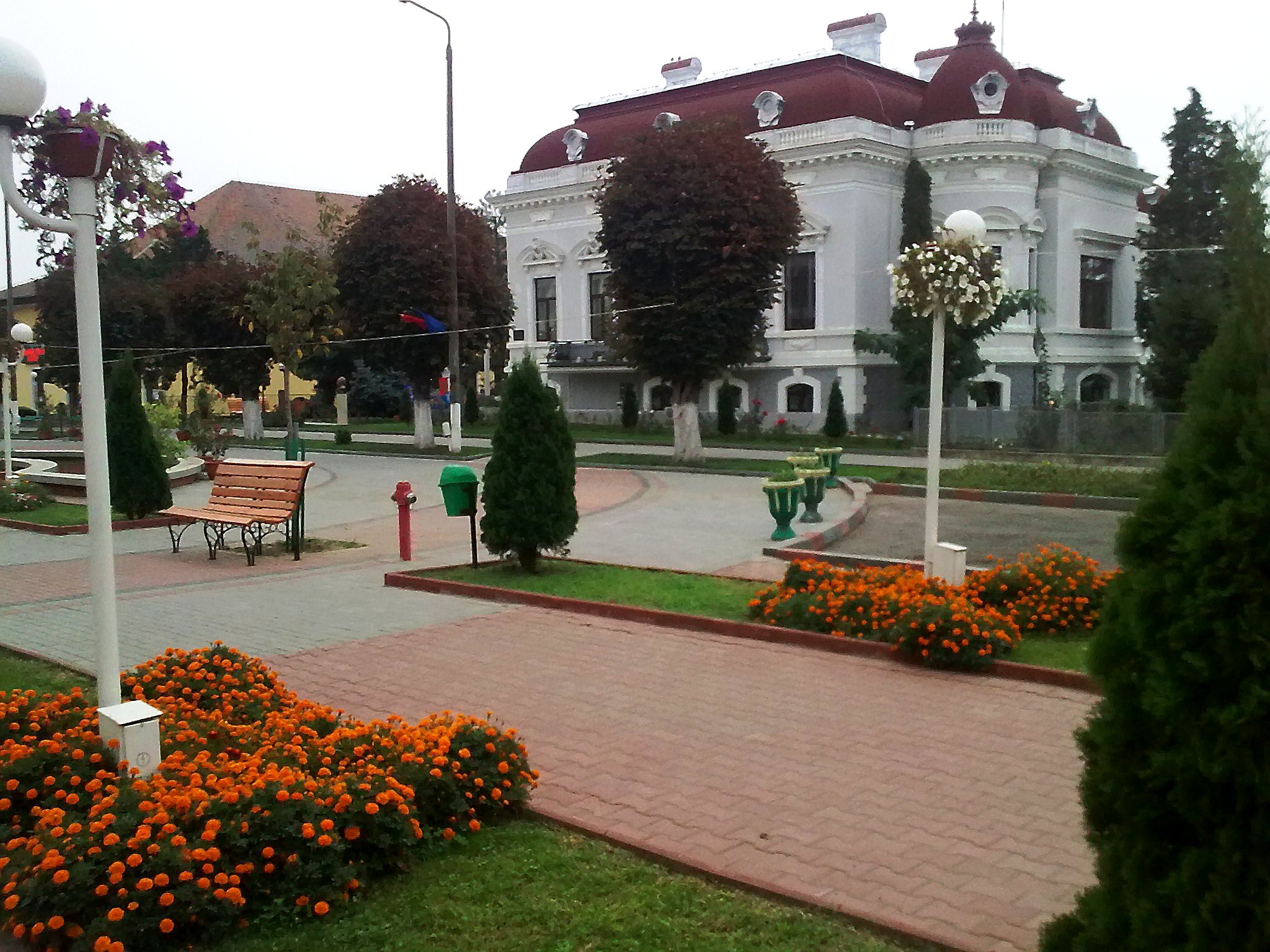
Calafat

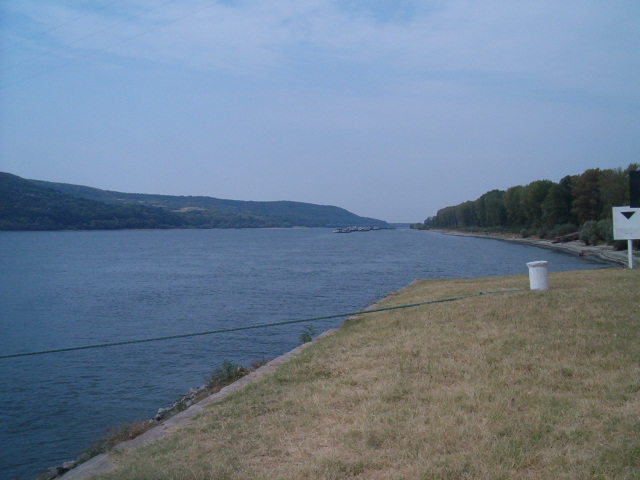
Danube at Bechet

Dolj County 3 municipalities, 4 towns and 104 communes

Municipalities

- Băilești
- Calafat
- Craiova – capital city; population: 243,765 (as of 2011)

Towns

- Bechet
- Dăbuleni
- Filiași
- Segarcea

Communes

- Afumați
- Almăj
- Amărăștii de Jos
- Amărăștii de Sus
- Apele Vii
- Argetoaia
- Bârca
- Bistreț
- Botoșești-Paia
- Brabova
- Brădești
- Braloștița
- Bratovoești
- Breasta
- Bucovăț
- Bulzești
- Călărași
- Calopăr
- Caraula
- Cârcea
- Cârna
- Carpen
- Castranova
- Catane
- Celaru
- Cerăt
- Cernătești
- Cetate
- Cioroiași
- Ciupercenii Noi
- Coșoveni
- Coțofenii din Dos
- Coțofenii din Față
- Daneți
- Desa
- Dioști
- Dobrești
- Dobrotești
- Drăgotești
- Drănic
- Fărcaș
- Galicea Mare
- Galiciuica
- Gângiova
- Ghercești
- Ghidici
- Ghindeni
- Gighera
- Giubega
- Giurgița
- Gogoșu
- Goicea
- Goiești
- Grecești
- Întorsura
- Ișalnița
- Izvoare
- Leu
- Lipovu
- Măceșu de Jos
- Măceșu de Sus
- Maglavit
- Malu Mare
- Mârșani
- Melinești
- Mischii
- Moțăței
- Murgași
- Negoi
- Orodel
- Ostroveni
- Perișor
- Pielești
- Piscu Vechi
- Plenița
- Pleșoi
- Podari
- Poiana Mare
- Predești
- Radovan
- Rast
- Robănești
- Rojiște
- Sadova
- Sălcuța
- Scăești
- Seaca de Câmp
- Seaca de Pădure
- Secu
- Siliștea Crucii
- Șimnicu de Sus
- Sopot
- Tălpaș
- Teasc
- Terpezița
- Teslui
- Țuglui
- Unirea
- Urzicuța
- Valea Stanciului
- Vârtop
- Vârvoru de Jos
- Vela
- Verbița

== Historical county ==
Județul Dolj
- County (Județ)
- The building of the Dolj County prefecture from the interwar period.

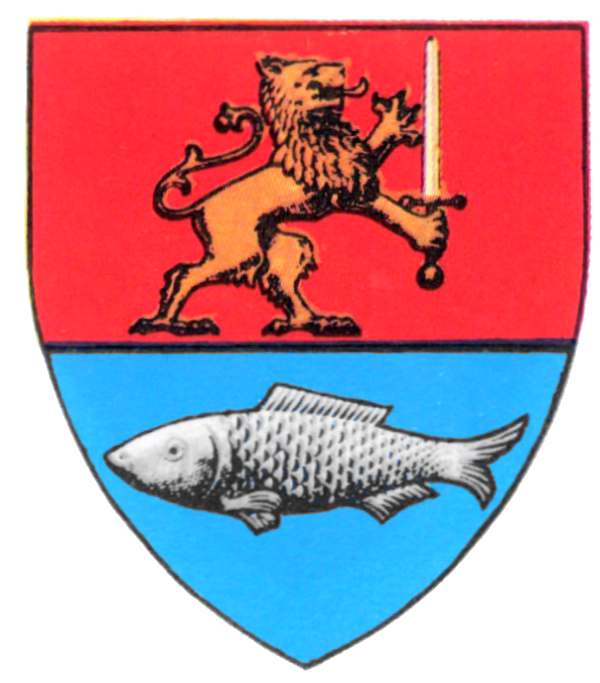
- Coat of arms

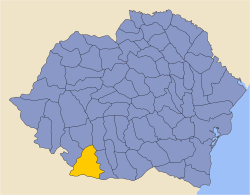
- Country: Romania
- Historic region: Oltenia
- Capital city (Reședință de județ): Craiova

Area
  - Total: 6,538 km^{2} (2,524 sq mi)

Population (1930)
  - Total: 485,149
  - Density: 74.20/km^{2} (192.2/sq mi)
- Time zone: UTC+2 (EET)
  - Summer (DST): UTC+3 (EEST)

Historically, the county was located in the southwestern part of Greater Romania, in the southwest part of the historical region of Oltenia. Its capital was Craiova. The interwar county territory comprised the central and southwestern part of the current Dolj county. It was bordered to the north with by the counties of Gorj and Valcea, to the west by Mehedinți County, to the east by Romanați County, and to the south by the Kingdom of Bulgaria.

=== Administration ===
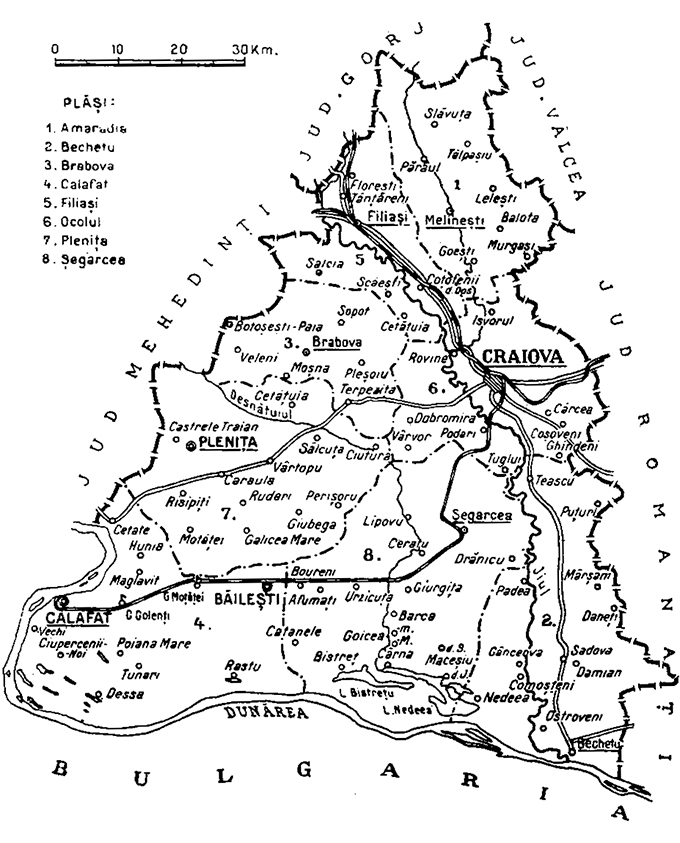
Map of Dolj County as constituted in 1938.

The county was originally divided into six administrative districts (plăși):

1. Plasa Amaradia, headquartered at Melinești
2. Plasa Bârca, headquartered at Bârca
3. Plasa Calafat, headquartered at Calafat
4. Plasa Gângiova, headquartered at Gângiova
5. Plasa Ocolul, headquartered at Ocolul
6. Plasa Plenița, headquartered at Plenița

Subsequently, four districts were created in place of two of the prior districts (Plasa Bârca and Plasa Gângiova):

1. Plasa Bechet, headquartered at Bechet
2. Plasa Brabova, headquartered at Brabova
3. Plasa Filiași, headquartered at Filiași
4. Plasa Segarcea, headquartered at Segarcea

=== Population ===
According to the 1930 census data, the county population was 485,149 inhabitants, ethnically divided as follows: 96.7% Romanian, 0.5% Jews, 0.3% Germans, 0.3% Hungarians, as well as other minorities. From the religious point of view, the population was 98.4% Eastern Orthodox, 0.7% Roman Catholic, 0.5% Jewish, as well as other minorities.

==== Urban population ====
In 1930, the county's urban population was 91,788 inhabitants, comprising 90.2% Romanians, 2.4% Jews, 2.2% Romanies, 1.7% Germans, 1.3% Hungarians, as well as other minorities. From the religious point of view, the urban population was composed of 92.7% Eastern Orthodox, 3.1% Roman Catholic, 2.5% Jewish, 0.7% Lutheran, 0.3% Calvinist, 0.3% Greek Catholic, as well as other minorities.
