= Desnățui =

- Location within Romania

Location
- Country: Romania
- Counties: Mehedinți, Dolj

Physical characteristics
- Mouth: Danube
  - coordinates: 43.8365°N 23.5150°E
- Length: 115 km (71 mi)
- Basin size: 2,015 km^{2} (778 sq mi)

Basin features
- Progression: Danube→ Black Sea

The Desnățui is a left tributary of the river Danube in Romania. It discharges into the Danube near Bistreț, after passing through the Bistreț reservoir. It flows through the villages Gvardinița, Cleanov, Gubaucea, Sălcuța, Ciutura, Fântânele, Radovan, Lipovu, Cerăt, Giurgița, Bârca, Goicea and Bistreț. Its length is 115 km (71 mi) and its basin size is 2,015 km^{2} (778 sq mi).

== Tributaries ==
The following rivers are tributaries to the river Desnățui (from source to mouth):

- Left: Burduhosul, Ciutura, Terpezița, Valea Rea, Buzat
- Right: Olteanca, Gârbov, Putinei, Bănaguiu, Băldal, Baboia
