= 2026 IHF Women's U18 Handball World Championship squads =

Handball tournament squads

This article displays the squads for the 2026 IHF Women's U18 Handball World Championship in Romania. Each team consisted of a maximum of 18 players.

Age, club, appearances and goals correct as of 29 July 2026.

== Group A ==
=== Croatia ===
The final squad was announced on 20 July 2026.

Head coach: Ivan Jerković

No.	Pos.	Name	Date of birth (age)	Height	App.	Goals	Club
2	LW	Maja Košćec	5 February 2008 (aged 18)	1.71 m	32	60	(Croatia) RK Zelina
3	RW	Rahela Varga	29 October 2008 (aged 17)	1.58 m	51	131	(Croatia) ŽRK Zrinski Čakovec
4	LB	Helena Furčić	12 January 2008 (aged 18)	1.70 m	34	84	(Croatia) ŽRK Trešnjevka
6	P	Ana Đolonga	2 December 2008 (aged 17)	1.78 m	41	77	(Croatia) RK Podravka
9	CB	Antea Jerković	15 February 2008 (aged 18)	1.72 m	53	225	(Croatia) RK Dalmatinka
11	P	Nika Batinić	26 March 2008 (aged 18)	1.75 m	45	68	(Croatia) RK Dalmatinka
12	GK	Vanessa Bebić	22 May 2008 (aged 18)	1.79 m	45	1	(Croatia) RK Dalmatinka
13	LB	Eda Nikolić	29 February 2008 (aged 18)	1.77 m	44	49	(Croatia) RK Lokomotiva
14	LW	Maja Hajdinjak	21 October 2008 (aged 17)	1.68 m	4	4	(Croatia) RK Podravka
15	LB	Tena Jurlina	1 July 2008 (aged 18)	1.72 m	48	130	(Croatia) RK Podravka
19	CB	Tina Ravlić	21 September 2008 (aged 17)	1.73 m	15	37	(Croatia) ŽRK Sinj
22	RW	Vanja Špehar	15 August 2008 (aged 17)	1.64 m	22	10	(Croatia) RK Dalmatinka
24	RW	Luna Gugić	14 June 2009 (aged 17)	1.65 m	4	4	(Croatia) ŽRK Koka
25	LB	Lana Jurić	8 April 2009 (aged 17)	1.80 m	4	17	(Croatia) RK Lokomotiva
26	P	Luna Gojak	26 October 2009 (aged 16)	1.81 m	35	8	(Croatia) ŽRK Ivanić
32	GK	Lora Tetec	5 June 2009 (aged 17)	1.83 m	0	0	(Croatia) RK Podravka
34	LB	Marta Kosanović	12 September 2008 (aged 17)	1.77 m	0	0	(Croatia) ŽRK Zamet
35	GK	Kristina Goričanec	21 March 2008 (aged 18)	1.73 m	2	0	(Croatia) ŽRK Zrinski Čakovec

=== Egypt ===
The final squad was announced on 18 July 2026.

Head coach: Mohamed Abdelkarim

No.	Pos.	Name	Date of birth (age)	Height	App.	Goals	Club
1	GK	Jaydaa Salama	18 February 2009 (aged 17)	1.82 m	4	1	(Egypt) Aviation SC
3	LW	Jowaireya Abdallah	31 January 2009 (aged 17)	1.64 m	5	17	(Egypt) Bakous SC
7	LB	Farah Morsi	25 June 2008 (aged 18)	1.77 m	4	5	(Egypt) Smouha SC
8	RW	Farida Alian	25 March 2008 (aged 18)	1.75 m	5	11	(Egypt) Bakous SC
10	CB	Merna Abdelnaser	23 March 2008 (aged 18)	1.65 m	10	14	(Egypt) Bakous SC
12	GK	Jana Labanah	18 December 2008 (aged 17)	1.76 m	4	0	(Egypt) Al Ahly
17	LW	Mai Mahmoud	16 January 2009 (aged 17)	1.71 m	5	1	(Egypt) Zamalek SC
20	LB	Joudy Mohamed	25 August 2008 (aged 17)	1.78 m	4	7	(Egypt) El Shams SC
24	LB	Sondos Abouelazaiem	1 January 2008 (aged 18)	1.69 m	7	19	(Egypt) Giza SC
30	CB	Reem Ahmed	31 January 2008 (aged 18)	1.74 m	5	21	(Egypt) Al Ahly
44	LB	Mariem Abdelhalim	2 March 2010 (aged 16)	1.70 m	0	0	(Egypt) El Shams SC
55	RW	Malak Elbadry	7 August 2009 (aged 16)	1.72 m	4	4	(Egypt) Horse Owners' Club
66	RB	Malak Aboyoussef	9 April 2008 (aged 18)	1.65 m	13	37	(Egypt) Al Zohour SC
77	RB	Yasmine Farrag	26 December 2008 (aged 17)	1.69 m	0	0	(Egypt) 6th of October SC
80	LB	Habiba Elgohary	31 May 2008 (aged 18)	1.72 m	0	0	(Egypt) Al Zohour SC
88	GK	Retaj Mohamed	25 March 2009 (aged 17)	1.78 m	3	0	(Egypt) Al Zohour SC
89	P	Zeina Kotb	10 June 2008 (aged 18)	1.80 m	5	6	(Egypt) El Shams SC
90	P	Zeina Elgohary	31 May 2008 (aged 18)	1.70 m	0	0	(Egypt) Al Zohour SC

=== France ===
The final squad was announced on 10 July 2026.

Head coach: Olivier de Lafuente

No.	Pos.	Name	Date of birth (age)	Height	App.	Goals	Club
1	GK	Gabrielle Kabeya Tshisola	16 January 2008 (aged 18)	1.78 m	0	0	(France) Issy-Paris Hand
2	CB	Thya Hellegoët	17 June 2010 (aged 16)	1.70 m	1	1	(France) Brest Bretagne HB
5	RB	Lou Saramito	19 January 2008 (aged 18)	1.69 m	0	0	(France) Rennes Métropole HBC
6	LW	Marie-Ève Holler	4 May 2008 (aged 18)	1.77 m	8	8	(France) Metz HB
7	LW	Grâce Mpioso Mabilama	15 June 2008 (aged 18)	1.67 m	9	15	(France) Noisy-le-Grand HB
8	CB	Manon Lemeiter	4 April 2008 (aged 18)	1.73 m	6	7	(France) Saint-Amand HB
9	LB	Aminata Niakaté	19 September 2008 (aged 17)	1.70 m	0	0	(France) HB Octeville-sur-Mer
10	RW	Emma Plancon	24 June 2008 (aged 18)	1.71 m	0	0	(France) ESBF Besançon
11	P	Maloé Jahan	26 July 2009 (aged 17)	1.73 m	0	0	(France) Saint-Sébastien-sur-Loire
12	GK	Nayla Pennavaxre	7 February 2009 (aged 17)	1.78 m	6	0	(France) Stella Saint-Maur HB
13	RW	Binta Kamara	5 January 2009 (aged 17)	1.73 m	6	13	(France) Issy-Paris Hand
15	LB	Corentine Cavalier	5 April 2008 (aged 18)	1.80 m	6	13	(France) ATH Strasbourg
16	GK	Célia Mongo	8 July 2009 (aged 17)	1.76 m	6	0	(France) Aulnay HB
17	LB	Gabrielle Buisson	15 May 2009 (aged 17)	1.72 m	0	0	(France) Jeanne d'Arc Dijon HB
18	RW	Oumou Traore	28 March 2009 (aged 17)	1.62 m	1	4	(France) Noisy-le-Grand HB
19	CB	Estitxu Ellisseche	13 August 2008 (aged 17)	1.80 m	4	9	(France) Mérignac HB
20	RB	Tylia Paillasson	15 February 2009 (aged 17)	1.84 m	12	21	(France) HB Val d'Argens
22	P	Clémentine Berthelot	29 April 2009 (aged 17)	1.80 m	0	0	(France) Stade pessacais Union Club HB

=== Fiji ===
The final squad was announced on 25 July 2026.

Head coach: Dickinson Garoleo

No.	Pos.	Name	Date of birth (age)	Height	App.	Goals	Club
1	GK	Lavenia Ravuna	21 March 2009 (aged 17)	1.78 m	0	0	(Fiji) Tailevu
3	P	Ivamere Buituni	13 March 2008 (aged 18)	1.79 m	0	0	(Fiji) Tailevu
5	LW	Ana Biu	18 November 2009 (aged 16)	1.72 m	0	0	(Fiji) Golden Eagles
6	RB	Rositalei Matakarawa	23 July 2009 (aged 17)	1.75 m	0	0	(Fiji) Golden Eagles
7	LB	Mele Kocovanua	6 March 2011 (aged 15)	1.55 m	0	0	(Fiji) Dream Together Warriors
11	LW	Esther Bola	2 March 2010 (aged 16)	1.69 m	0	0	(Fiji) Tailevu
13	RB	Alena Moto	31 December 2008 (aged 17)	1.69 m	0	0	(Fiji) Tailevu
14	GK	Paulina Nagata	31 January 2010 (aged 16)	1.69 m	0	0	(Fiji) Namosi
18	LB	Banuve Logavatu	8 February 2008 (aged 18)	1.82 m	0	0	(Fiji) Golden Eagles
20	CB	Sainimili Logavatu	1 September 2009 (aged 16)	1.80 m	0	0	(Fiji) Golden Eagles
22	RB	Litia Vuniwai	3 July 2010 (aged 16)	1.75 m	0	0	(Fiji) Dream Together Warriors
28	CB	Paulini Raogo	20 April 2008 (aged 18)	1.78 m	0	0	(Fiji) Namosi

== Group B ==
=== Czech Republic ===
The final squad was announced on 27 July 2026.

Head coach: Petra Vítková

No.	Pos.	Name	Date of birth (age)	Height	App.	Goals	Club
1	GK	Tereza Skopcová	7 December 2008 (aged 17)	1.71 m	30	0	(Czech Republic) DHC Slavia Praha
2	LW	Barbora Hanzlíková	20 October 2008 (aged 17)	1.65 m	40	102	(Czech Republic) DHC Plzeň
3	CB	Linda Máčalová	21 March 2008 (aged 18)	1.69 m	41	102	(Czech Republic) HC Zlín
4	LB	Karolína Kleindienstová	18 February 2008 (aged 18)	1.74 m	0	0	(Czech Republic) DHC Slavia Praha
5	RW	Adéla Rumianová	12 January 2009 (aged 17)	1.65 m	11	11	(Czech Republic) DHK Zora Olomouc
6	CB	Kateřina Kokošková	25 January 2008 (aged 18)	1.76 m	40	30	(Czech Republic) DHC Plzeň
7	RW	Anežka Francová	4 July 2008 (aged 18)	1.70 m	20	64	(Czech Republic) DHC Slavia Praha
9	RB	Darja Máčalová	5 July 2009 (aged 17)	1.73 m	27	34	(Czech Republic) HC Zlín
13	P	Amélie Mikelová	28 May 2009 (aged 17)	1.71 m	9	5	(Czech Republic) HC Zlín
16	GK	Justýna Hodková	1 January 2008 (aged 18)	1.72 m	15	0	(Czech Republic) DHC Plzeň
18	RB	Anna Martínková	23 September 2008 (aged 17)	1.69 m	9	7	(Czech Republic) DHK Baník Most
20	LW	Adéla Janků	18 December 2008 (aged 17)	1.59 m	38	59	(Czech Republic) SKH Velká nad Veličkou
21	P	Sára Nedvědová	25 June 2008 (aged 18)	1.71 m	40	118	(Czech Republic) DHK Baník Most
23	CB	Adéla Masopustová	13 August 2008 (aged 17)	1.69 m	43	84	(Czech Republic) DHK Baník Most
24	LB	Markéta Königová	28 June 2009 (aged 17)	1.80 m	38	186	(Czech Republic) TJ Sokol Lázně Kynžvart
26	LB	Valéria Jíchová	12 July 2009 (aged 17)	1.71 m	2	3	(Germany) Handewitter SV

=== Denmark ===
The final squad was announced on 19 May 2026.

Head coach: Flemming Dam Larsen

No.	Pos.	Name	Date of birth (age)	Height	App.	Goals	Club
1	GK	Thilde Skov	18 August 2008 (aged 17)	1.84 m	17	0	(Denmark) GOG Håndbold
3	LW	Alicia Aluan	2 February 2008 (aged 18)	1.69 m	4	5	(Denmark) GOG Håndbold
4	LW	Marie Pedersen	31 July 2009 (aged 16)	1.69 m	5	6	(Denmark) Team Esbjerg
5	RB	Viola Clausen	30 April 2008 (aged 18)	1.74 m	3	3	(Denmark) København Håndbold
6	RW	Olivia Nygaard	25 July 2009 (aged 17)	1.74 m	4	6	(Denmark) SINE Håndbolddrenge
7	RB	Larke Moller	18 February 2009 (aged 17)	1.80 m	4	7	(Denmark) Vejle Idrætsefterskole
8	CB	Sara Norby	15 November 2008 (aged 17)	1.80 m	21	58	(Denmark) HH Elite
10	CB	Sofie Hansen	7 July 2009 (aged 17)	1.70 m	4	5	(Denmark) Idrætsefterskolen Lægården
11	LB	Sofie Christensen	21 April 2008 (aged 18)	1.85 m	2	1	(Denmark) EH Aalborg
14	LB	Caroline Todsen	30 June 2008 (aged 18)	1.74 m	18	53	(Denmark) GOG Håndbold
16	GK	Emilie Rosendal	12 August 2008 (aged 17)	1.79 m	3	0	(Denmark) København Håndbold
17	P	Lina Boye	24 March 2009 (aged 17)	1.79 m	2	4	(Denmark) Gunslevholm Idrætsefterskole
18	P	Mathilde Jantzen	14 October 2008 (aged 17)	1.83 m	2	4	(Denmark) Silkeborg-Voel KFUM
28	LB	Mille Spellerberg	4 January 2009 (aged 17)	1.86 m	17	31	(Denmark) HH Elite
36	LB	Ulrikke Poulsen	22 December 2008 (aged 17)	1.75 m	0	0	(Denmark) GOG Håndbold
37	RW	Cecilia Dreisig	16 February 2008 (aged 18)	1.60 m	18	42	(Denmark) GOG Håndbold

=== Mexico ===
The final squad was announced on 21 July 2026.

Head coach: Selene Sifuentes

No.	Pos.	Name	Date of birth (age)	Height	App.	Goals	Club
2	CB	Grissel Maldonado	25 July 2008 (aged 18)	1.65 m	0	0	(Mexico) Chihuahua
3	GK	Andrea Rodela	29 July 2008 (aged 18)	1.54 m	0	0	(Mexico) Chihuahua
4	RB	Natalia Zapien	6 June 2008 (aged 18)	1.76 m	0	0	(Mexico) Chihuahua
5	RW	Camila Aguilera	11 February 2008 (aged 18)	1.70 m	0	0	(Mexico) Aguascalientes HC
6	P	Daniela López	20 February 2009 (aged 17)	1.73 m	0	0	(Mexico) Aguascalientes HC
8	CB	Melissa Monraz	24 September 2009 (aged 16)	1.75 m	0	0	(Mexico) Colima HC
10	CB	Audrey Ruiz	11 April 2008 (aged 18)	1.51 m	0	0	(Mexico) Nuevo León HC
11	P	Danna Chávez	23 February 2008 (aged 18)	1.69 m	0	0	(Mexico) Chihuahua
13	LW	Laura Sánchez	26 November 2008 (aged 17)	1.68 m	0	0	(Mexico) Chihuahua
17	GK	Hanna Juárez	17 February 2009 (aged 17)	1.73 m	0	0	(Mexico) Nuevo León HC
24	LW	María Muñoz	11 February 2009 (aged 17)	1.71 m	0	0	(Mexico) Chihuahua
28	CB	Alondra Álvarez	29 December 2008 (aged 17)	1.63 m	0	0	(Mexico) Colima C
33	GK	Melina Hernández	1 May 2009 (aged 17)	1.80 m	0	0	(Mexico) Jalisco HC
91	RB	Abril Anguiano	19 May 2009 (aged 17)	1.77 m	0	0	(Mexico) Nuevo León HC
99	CB	Myrna Silva	7 August 2008 (aged 17)	1.80 m	0	0	(Mexico) Colima HC

=== South Korea ===
The final squad was announced on 27 July 2026.

Head coach: Park Jung-jin

No.	Pos.	Name	Date of birth (age)	Height	App.	Goals	Club
1	GK	Ha Neul-bit	27 July 2008 (aged 18)	1.75 m	0	0	(South Korea) Chungshin Girls' High School
6	LW	Shin Ye-won	10 October 2009 (aged 16)	1.60 m	0	0	(South Korea) Incheon Business High School
7	LB	Lee Yeon-ju	3 March 2009 (aged 17)	1.73 m	0	0	(South Korea) Incheon Business High School
9	LW	Kim Na-hyeon	13 July 2009 (aged 17)	1.64 m	0	0	(South Korea) Hwangji Information Industry High School
10	LB	Kim Eun-yul	16 August 2008 (aged 17)	1.73 m	0	0	(South Korea) Chungshin Girls' High School
11	P	Kim Hyo-pin	15 April 2008 (aged 18)	1.67 m	0	0	(South Korea) Hwangji Information Industry High School
12	GK	Shin Da-bin	8 April 2008 (aged 18)	1.74 m	0	0	(South Korea) Cheonan Technical High School
15	P	Chae Min-jeong	1 June 2009 (aged 17)	1.65 m	0	0	(South Korea) Ilshin Girl's High School
16	GK	Im Ji-min	21 June 2008 (aged 18)	1.73 m	0	0	(South Korea) Incheon Business High School
17	RW	Cho Eun-yool	26 May 2008 (aged 18)	1.73 m	0	0	(South Korea) Chungshin Girls' High School
20	CB	Shin Eun-seo	7 July 2009 (aged 17)	1.65 m	0	0	(South Korea) Ilshin Girl's High School
21	RB	Oh In-hye	21 June 2008 (aged 18)	1.65 m	0	0	(South Korea) Incheon Business High School
22	RW	Lee Soo-ah	26 February 2008 (aged 18)	1.64 m	0	0	(South Korea) Incheon Business High School
23	CB	Cho Min-jin	31 March 2008 (aged 18)	1.62 m	0	0	(South Korea) Incheon Business High School
24	P	Lee Ju-eun	11 August 2008 (aged 17)	1.66 m	0	0	(South Korea) Incheon Business High School
29	RB	Kang Min-ji	22 October 2009 (aged 16)	1.65 m	0	0	(South Korea) Daegu Physical Education High School
31	LB	Lee Chae-min	13 June 2008 (aged 18)	1.77 m	0	0	(South Korea) Daegu Physical Education High School
35	RB	Lee Jin-sol	11 January 2009 (aged 17)	1.65 m	0	0	(South Korea) Daejeon Physical Education High School

== Group C ==
=== Germany ===
The final squad was announced on 20 July 2026.

Head coach: (Netherlands) Gino Smits

No.	Pos.	Name	Date of birth (age)	Height	App.	Goals	Club
1	GK	Marlene Wagner	7 July 2008 (aged 18)	1.78 m	0	0	(Germany) Bergischer HC
3	RW	Mara Lehmann	16 March 2008 (aged 18)	1.62 m	0	0	(Germany) Borussia Dortmund
4	RW	Hanna Walther	15 July 2008 (aged 18)	1.61 m	0	0	(Germany) HSG Bensheim/Auerbach
6	CB	Pia Kastner	5 July 2008 (aged 18)	1.65 m	0	0	(Germany) HC Rödertal
7	CB	Meggan Rusko	28 September 2008 (aged 17)	1.77 m	0	0	(Germany) HSG Blomberg-Lippe
9	CB	Fine Stenzel	15 March 2008 (aged 18)	1.77 m	0	0	(Germany) SV Fortuna '50 Neubrandenburg
10	LB	Jule-Marie Jördens	21 September 2008 (aged 17)	1.76 m	0	0	(Germany) TSV Hannover-Badenstedt
11	LB	Paula Hofer	19 August 2008 (aged 17)	1.70 m	0	0	(Germany) VfL Waiblingen
15	P	Katlyn Reymann	3 July 2008 (aged 18)	1.68 m	0	0	(Germany) DJK Heimschule Ettenheim
18	RB	Tamina Kugler	6 June 2008 (aged 18)	1.75 m	0	0	(Germany) SV Grün-Weiß Schwerin
20	LB	Adele Kasper	4 May 2008 (aged 18)	1.81 m	0	0	(Germany) Frankfurter HC
21	P	Victoria Hardekopf	27 September 2009 (aged 16)	1.84 m	0	0	(Germany) VfL Bad Schwartau
29	LB	Luna Kölker	3 August 2009 (aged 16)	1.88 m	0	0	(Germany) HSV Solingen-Gräfrath
30	LW	Janne Overbeck	9 August 2008 (aged 17)	1.63 m	0	0	(Germany) HSG Blomberg-Lippe
31	LW	Laura Schatton	22 February 2009 (aged 17)	1.68 m	0	0	(Germany) HSV Solingen-Gräfrath
83	GK	Lotta Willuhn	29 May 2008 (aged 18)	1.93 m	0	0	(Germany) TSV Hannover-Badenstedt

=== Guinea ===
The final squad was announced on 26 July 2026.

Head coach: Titi Mara

No.	Pos.	Name	Date of birth (age)	Height	App.	Goals	Club
1	GK	Mama Camara	6 July 2008 (aged 18)	1.63 m	7	0	(Guinea) Espoir Olympique
2	LW	Mabinty Camara	12 July 2008 (aged 18)	1.62 m	14	20	(Guinea) Espoir Olympique
3	CB	Edite Sokpo	1 January 2010 (aged 16)	1.70 m	7	7	(Guinea) Espoir Olympique
4	RB	Diaka Kaba	10 April 2010 (aged 16)	1.65 m	0	0	(Guinea) Union Sportive de Guinée
5	RW	Aissatou Diallo	14 February 2008 (aged 18)	1.59 m	24	69	(Guinea) Gymnastic Athletic Club Kamateroy
6	P	Celestine Kolie	17 June 2008 (aged 18)	1.60 m	15	18	(Guinea) Allu Star de Fria
7	LB	Jade Racine	4 May 2009 (aged 17)	1.63 m	7	3	(Guinea) HBF 3M
8	LB	Fatoumata Soumah	3 January 2010 (aged 16)	1.68 m	7	25	(Guinea) Stade de Guinée
9	LB	Mariama Diallo	24 December 2008 (aged 17)	1.67 m	8	1	(Guinea) Kamsar Handball Club
11	CB	Yarie Mansare	1 January 2010 (aged 16)	1.66 m	7	26	(Guinea) Stade de Guinée
12	CB	Fatou Keïta	18 November 2008 (aged 17)	1.65 m	14	2	(Guinea) Tout Puissant de Guinée
13	RW	Mamadama Bangoura	1 December 2010 (aged 15)	1.67 m	0	0	(Guinea) Kamsar Handball Club
16	GK	Aicha Richard	15 December 2008 (aged 17)	1.65 m	6	0	(Guinea) Union Sportive de Guinée
17	P	N'nady Sylla	15 November 2008 (aged 17)	1.79 m	7	7	(Guinea) Kamsar Handball Club
18	P	Feremoussou Traore	20 April 2010 (aged 16)	1.67 m	0	0	(Guinea) Lion Star de Guinée
20	GK	Ramatoulaye Barry	11 March 2008 (aged 18)	1.66 m	0	0	(Guinea) Stade de Guinée
22	LB	Aminata Soumah	6 April 2008 (aged 18)	1.63 m	7	21	(Guinea) Union Sportive de Guinée
26	P	Mariame Diallo	2 April 2008 (aged 18)	1.65 m	12	2	(Guinea) Horoya HC

=== Spain ===
The final squad was announced on 20 July 2026.

Head coach: Cristina Cabeza

No.	Pos.	Name	Date of birth (age)	Height	App.	Goals	Club
2	P	Andrea Palomero	7 May 2008 (aged 18)	1.81 m	21	11	(Spain) CB Morvedre
3	P	Aitana Hernández	11 April 2008 (aged 18)	1.67 m	6	2	(Spain) CB Mislata
4	RW	Oihana Murgiondo	27 May 2008 (aged 18)	1.75 m	11	24	(Spain) BM Bera Bera
5	RW	Edurne Donderis	3 January 2008 (aged 18)	1.70 m	22	38	(Spain) CB Leganés
6	LW	Nora Merino	13 December 2008 (aged 17)	1.73 m	2	1	(Spain) Zarautz KE
7	RW	Erika Vladu	25 September 2008 (aged 17)	1.75 m	16	16	(Spain) CB Elche
9	RB	Elene Fresco	27 September 2008 (aged 17)	1.77 m	22	49	(Spain) BM Bera Bera
10	CB	Lucía Calleja	2 August 2009 (aged 16)	1.60 m	22	50	(Spain) CB Elche
11	LB	Queralt Fornt	31 January 2008 (aged 18)	1.78 m	6	7	(Spain) Handbol Sant Quirze
12	GK	Paula Millaruelo	25 January 2008 (aged 18)	1.72 m	19	0	(Spain) Handbol Sant Joan Despi
13	LB	Lucía Moreno	30 November 2008 (aged 17)	1.60 m	14	11	(Spain) BM Granollers
14	LB	Nagore Alza	4 May 2008 (aged 18)	1.74 m	2	0	(Spain) Zarautz KE
15	LW	Andrea Pérez	16 May 2008 (aged 18)	1.60 m	5	6	(Spain) CB Morvedre
16	GK	Rebeca Secades	22 April 2008 (aged 18)	1.71 m	22	1	(Spain) CB Morvedre
17	RW	Laura Ferrer	22 June 2009 (aged 17)	1.70 m	10	8	(Spain) CB Elche
18	LB	June Aguinagalde	16 November 2008 (aged 17)	1.75 m	2	2	(Spain) SCRD Helvetia Anaitasuna
19	CB	Iraia Berroeta	24 July 2009 (aged 17)	1.70 m	5	5	(Spain) CB Kukullaga

=== Uzbekistan ===
The final squad was announced on 28 July 2026.

Head coach: Ulugbek Ikromov

No.	Pos.	Name	Date of birth (age)	Height	App.	Goals	Club
1	GK	Gulsanam Sayidmurodova	15 April 2008 (aged 18)	1.75 m	0	0	(Uzbekistan) No Club
2	CB	Nazira Ismoilova	6 January 2008 (aged 18)	1.60 m	0	0	(Uzbekistan) No Club
3	LW	Nozima Rasuljonova	24 June 2008 (aged 18)	1.80 m	0	0	(Uzbekistan) No Club
5	CB	Uljamal Pirjanova	1 February 2008 (aged 18)	1.67 m	1	5	(Uzbekistan) No Club
6	LW	Zukhra Tokhirova	17 February 2008 (aged 18)	1.66 m	0	0	(Uzbekistan) No Club
7	CB	Odina Soatalieva	25 September 2009 (aged 16)	1.70 m	1	7	(Uzbekistan) No Club
8	CB	Dildora Majidova	25 March 2008 (aged 18)	1.67 m	0	0	(Uzbekistan) No Club
9	LB	Shalola Keldiyorova	19 May 2008 (aged 18)	1.69 m	0	0	(Uzbekistan) No Club
10	CB	Ziyoda Riskulova	8 April 2008 (aged 18)	1.68 m	1	5	(Uzbekistan) No Club
12	LB	Oyjamolkhon Jumanova	16 April 2008 (aged 18)	1.67 m	1	1	(Uzbekistan) No Club
13	DEF	Guzal Em	8 July 2009 (aged 17)	1.70 m	1	1	(Uzbekistan) No Club
15	LW	Ilmira Bayjanova	30 May 2008 (aged 18)	1.67 m	8	12	(Uzbekistan) No Club
17	RB	Ibodatjon Gaybullaeva	27 May 2008 (aged 18)	1.68 m	0	0	(Uzbekistan) No Club
19	P	Mushtariybonu Abdukhalikova	5 August 2009 (aged 16)	1.72 m	1	1	(Uzbekistan) No Club
20	CB	Naimakhon Turgunova	12 June 2009 (aged 17)	1.65 m	0	0	(Uzbekistan) No Club
49	LW	Raykhona Uzokova	18 July 2008 (aged 18)	1.65 m	1	1	(Uzbekistan) No Club

== Group D ==
=== Argentina ===
The final squad was announced on 8 July 2026.

Head coach: Gastón González

No.	Pos.	Name	Date of birth (age)	Height	App.	Goals	Club
1	GK	Maia Pecnik	4 December 2008 (aged 17)	1.75 m	4	0	(Argentina) Club Vilo
4	RW	Alma Gomez	15 August 2009 (aged 16)	1.70 m	8	12	(Argentina) Club Ferrocarril Mitre
5	CB	Melina Cabrera	6 January 2009 (aged 17)	1.59 m	18	28	(Argentina) Luján
6	LW	Catalina Podesta	9 November 2008 (aged 17)	1.69 m	13	32	(Argentina) Ferro Carril Oeste
7	RB	Josefina Carrizo	13 January 2009 (aged 17)	1.65 m	8	22	(Argentina) Luján
9	RW	Luo Genoud	3 March 2009 (aged 17)	1.70 m	25	66	(Argentina) SEDALO
10	CB	Antonella Quiroz	8 June 2008 (aged 18)	1.67 m	8	47	(Argentina) Municipalidad de San Miguel
13	LW	Alma Tojo	31 August 2008 (aged 17)	1.67 m	8	17	(Argentina) Club Atlético Lanús
15	P	Emma Bernasconi	15 October 2008 (aged 17)	1.88 m	8	11	(Argentina) Escuela Modelo Mariano Acosta
16	GK	Victoria Trebini	7 February 2010 (aged 16)	1.78 m	8	0	(Argentina) Luján
17	RB	Lucía Gimenez	5 January 2008 (aged 18)	1.71 m	19	53	(Argentina) Ferro Carril Oeste
19	CB	Coral Vivacqua	10 May 2008 (aged 18)	1.66 m	4	12	(Argentina) AACF Quilmes
22	LB	Milagros Hayet	2 March 2009 (aged 17)	1.81 m	5	18	(Argentina) CIDECO
26	LB	Renata Pangaro	22 February 2008 (aged 18)	1.83 m	7	3	(Argentina) SEDALO
54	LB	Martina Bustos	1 September 2009 (aged 16)	1.82 m	0	0	(Argentina) Club Vilo
66	P	Morena Tallarico	26 August 2008 (aged 17)	1.75 m	4	3	(Argentina) Luján

=== Montenegro ===
The final squad was announced on 27 July 2026.

Head coach: Miloš Perović

No.	Pos.	Name	Date of birth (age)	Height	App.	Goals	Club
3	CB	Andrea Dragnić	7 May 2009 (aged 17)	1.70 m	8	20	(Montenegro) RK Levalea 2010
4	RW	Andrea Jovanović	6 May 2009 (aged 17)	1.84 m	8	21	(Montenegro) RK Trebjesa
6	LW	Jovana Tešović	16 January 2008 (aged 18)	1.76 m	8	21	(Montenegro) OTP Group Buducnost
7	P	Mia Ulićević	10 August 2008 (aged 17)	1.86 m	8	1	(Montenegro) RK Zeta
8	LB	Anđelina Orbović	15 January 2008 (aged 18)	1.84 m	16	43	(Montenegro) ŻRK Tivat
9	RB	Ivona Bojanović	30 July 2008 (aged 17)	1.76 m	0	0	(Montenegro) OTP Group Buducnost
10	RB	Nejla Hodžić	4 September 2009 (aged 16)	1.70 m	2	2	(Montenegro) RK Ulcinj
12	GK	Ivana Knežević	28 January 2009 (aged 17)	1.78 m	5	0	(Montenegro) RK Zeta
14	RB	Nina Gajević	29 May 2008 (aged 18)	1.84 m	0	0	(Montenegro) RK Trebjesa
16	GK	Maša Dubljević	8 June 2008 (aged 18)	1.78 m	8	0	(Montenegro) RK Trebjesa
19	P	Anđela Vujović	4 July 2009 (aged 17)	1.87 m	8	7	(Montenegro) RK Levalea 2010
22	RW	Lara Burzanović	18 May 2009 (aged 17)	1.67 m	8	2	(Montenegro) OTP Group Buducnost
23	CB	Ivana Savić	2 July 2008 (aged 18)	1.88 m	15	57	(Montenegro) RK Trebjesa
25	P	Sofija Delević	25 February 2008 (aged 18)	1.90 m	8	6	(Montenegro) OTP Group Buducnost
27	GK	Isidora Gogić	15 January 2008 (aged 18)	1.80 m	0	0	(Montenegro) RK Levalea 2010
30	CB	Vasilisa Savić	12 May 2010 (aged 16)	1.70 m	0	0	(Montenegro) RK Trebjesa
77	LW	Maša Ulićević	10 February 2008 (aged 18)	1.78 m	8	20	(Montenegro) OTP Group Buducnost

=== Netherlands ===
The final squad was announced on 13 May 2026.

Head coach: Michael Vijverberg

No.	Pos.	Name	Date of birth (age)	Height	App.	Goals	Club
1	GK	Danique Glorie	3 November 2008 (aged 17)	1.72 m	1	0	(Netherlands) Garage Kil/Volendam
2	GK	Camay Berkhout	27 August 2008 (aged 17)	1.81 m	0	0	(Netherlands) JuRo Unirek/VZV
4	RB	Esmee Pater	14 March 2009 (aged 17)	1.76 m	0	0	(Netherlands) Westfriesland/SEW
6	LB	Maureen van der Vliet	17 April 2008 (aged 18)	1.74 m	0	0	(Netherlands) Garage Kil/Volendam
7	LB	Joy Hofman	26 May 2008 (aged 18)	1.75 m	0	0	(Netherlands) OTTO Work Force/VOC
10	CB	Jane van der Raaij	11 May 2008 (aged 18)	1.71 m	16	7	(Netherlands) OTTO Work Force/VOC
11	P	Jelena Ostojic	29 October 2009 (aged 16)	1.79 m	0	0	(Netherlands) JuRo Unirek/VZV
12	CB	Tess Tuip	28 August 2009 (aged 16)	1.75 m	0	0	(Netherlands) Garage Kil/Volendam
13	LW	Guusje Hogervorst	17 October 2008 (aged 17)	1.70 m	0	0	(Netherlands) Westfriesland/SEW
14	RW	Lise Smink	5 December 2008 (aged 17)	1.75 m	0	0	(Netherlands) Cabooter Fortes/Venlo
15	LB	Veerle Hop	22 April 2009 (aged 17)	1.78 m	0	0	(Netherlands) OTTO Work Force/VOC
16	RW	Nina van Dalen	3 March 2010 (aged 16)	1.74 m	0	0	(Netherlands) RKHV Quintus
19	LW	Anniko Rensen	27 August 2008 (aged 17)	1.76 m	0	0	(Netherlands) Zwartwoud/Kwiek
20	CB	Ivana Kwakman	16 August 2009 (aged 16)	1.78 m	0	0	(Netherlands) OTTO Work Force/VOC
21	P	Marlies Tol	15 February 2008 (aged 18)	1.83 m	0	0	(Netherlands) Garage Kil/Volendam
22	RB	Fiene Alberts	26 April 2009 (aged 17)	1.82 m	0	0	(Netherlands) Geonius/V en L

=== Portugal ===
The final squad was announced on 15 July 2026.

Head coach: Sandra Fernandes

No.	Pos.	Name	Date of birth (age)	Height	App.	Goals	Club
4	LW	Eliany Carvalho	3 June 2009 (aged 17)	1.63 m	7	4	(Portugal) CDES Gil Eanes
5	RB	Matilde Figueiredo	18 March 2009 (aged 17)	1.77 m	29	68	(Portugal) ABC/UMinho
6	LB	Iara Francisco	15 April 2009 (aged 17)	1.75 m	24	42	(Portugal) CDES Gil Eanes
7	RW	Maria Lopes	4 February 2009 (aged 17)	1.73 m	31	54	(Portugal) Colégio de Gaia
8	LB	Mariana Carmo	9 August 2008 (aged 17)	1.75 m	21	23	(Portugal) CDES Gil Eanes
10	RB	Clara Silva	20 November 2009 (aged 16)	1.65 m	2	5	(Portugal) Promov Rebordosa
11	RW	Miriam Maio	10 November 2009 (aged 16)	1.61 m	16	39	(Portugal) ARC Alpendorada
12	GK	Leonor Ramos	3 July 2008 (aged 18)	1.74 m	40	0	(Portugal) Clube Jovem Almeida Garrett
13	CB	Rafaela Lopes	3 May 2008 (aged 18)	1.73 m	20	42	(Portugal) AC Alavarium
15	LW	Catarina Bernardino	19 April 2009 (aged 17)	1.65 m	15	51	(Portugal) SL Benfica
16	GK	Rafaela Torre	5 September 2008 (aged 17)	1.77 m	28	0	(Portugal) ABC/UMinho
17	LB	Bianca Lima	20 March 2008 (aged 18)	1.72 m	28	37	(Portugal) ABC/UMinho
19	P	Júnia Rita	1 April 2009 (aged 17)	1.77 m	0	0	(France) Fleury Loiret HB
20	P	Beatriz Barros	12 January 2008 (aged 18)	1.75 m	49	80	(Portugal) Madeira Andebol SAD
30	LB	Maria Lopes	18 November 2008 (aged 17)	1.74 m	25	116	(Portugal) ABC/UMinho
36	CB	Inês Monteiro	12 April 2008 (aged 18)	1.68 m	3	12	(Portugal) Clube Jovem Almeida Garrett

== Group E ==
=== Canada ===
The final squad was announced on 28 July 2026.

Head coach: Erik Choquette

No.	Pos.	Name	Date of birth (age)	Height	App.	Goals	Club
2	RW	Alexia Gousy	25 December 2009 (aged 16)	1.50 m	0	0	(Canada) Club de Handball de Drummondville
3	CB	Olivia Pelletier	17 May 2009 (aged 17)	1.72 m	0	0	(Canada) Club de Handball Champlain
4	LB	Azalée Morissette-Davies	8 December 2009 (aged 16)	1.60 m	0	0	(Canada) Club de Handball de Drummondville
5	CB	Frederique Turcotte	21 June 2009 (aged 17)	1.72 m	0	0	(Canada) Club de Handball Champlain
6	RW	Zoé Allard	7 December 2009 (aged 16)	1.52 m	0	0	(Canada) Club de Handball de Levis
7	CB	Amélie Leclair	25 July 2008 (aged 18)	1.72 m	14	23	(Canada) Club de Handball Champlain
11	P	Emma Rozon	11 September 2008 (aged 17)	1.72 m	11	5	(France) Mérignac HB
13	RW	Sofia Rioux	30 October 2008 (aged 17)	1.68 m	7	7	(Canada) Handball Laval
14	LB	Maya Sénéchal	22 March 2008 (aged 18)	1.55 m	0	0	(Canada) Club de Handball Granby
15	LB	Kathryn Masson	5 October 2009 (aged 16)	1.60 m	0	0	(Canada) Club de Handball Champlain
22	LB	Yasmina Ouassini	29 September 2008 (aged 17)	1.55 m	0	0	(Canada) Club de Handball de Levis
24	P	Kim-My Desilets	10 November 2008 (aged 17)	1.60 m	0	0	(Canada) Handball Laval
25	RW	Lili-Pier Côté	16 January 2009 (aged 17)	1.65 m	0	0	(Canada) Club de Handball de Drummondville
27	LW	Alexia Déry	27 October 2008 (aged 17)	1.60 m	0	0	(Canada) Club de Handball de Drummondville
31	LW	Anne-Marie Cossette	31 January 2008 (aged 18)	1.60 m	0	0	(Canada) Club de Handball de Levis
33	LB	Roselyne Roy	20 October 2008 (aged 17)	1.50 m	7	0	(Canada) Club de Handball Champlain
54	RB	Liv Jimerson	21 February 2008 (aged 18)	1.60 m	0	0	(Canada) Club de Handball de Drummondville

=== Hungary ===
The final squad was announced on 27 July 2026.

Head coach: Attila Kun

No.	Pos.	Name	Date of birth (age)	Height	App.	Goals	Club
6	RB	Lilla Somogyi	26 June 2008 (aged 18)	1.77 m	40	3	(Hungary) Győri Audi ETO KC
7	CB	Liza Kozma	9 April 2008 (aged 18)	1.74 m	28	4	(Hungary) Ferencvárosi TC
8	LW	Fanni Nagy-Hajdú	2 August 2008 (aged 17)	1.67 m	0	3	(Hungary) NEKA
10	P	Szófia Bajnok	29 March 2008 (aged 18)	1.72 m	20	2	(Hungary) Ferencvárosi TC
11	CB	Blanka Szigeti	19 July 2008 (aged 18)	1.71 m	20	3	(Hungary) Ferencvárosi TC
13	RW	Petra Keller	27 July 2008 (aged 18)	1.66 m	15	5	(Hungary) Debreceni VSC
14	LW	Janka Zákányi	6 May 2009 (aged 17)	1.71 m	20	5	(Hungary) Győri Audi ETO KC
16	GK	Noémi Radics	12 July 2009 (aged 17)	1.74 m	2	13	(Hungary) Kecskeméti NKSE
17	P	Sarolta Szinay	13 November 2008 (aged 17)	1.65 m	40	3	(Hungary) Debreceni VSC
22	RB	Maja Takács	30 July 2008 (aged 17)	1.70 m	32	4	(Hungary) Győri Audi ETO KC
29	LB	Eszter Léránt	26 June 2008 (aged 18)	1.76 m	8	5	(Hungary) Győri Audi ETO KC
36	GK	Lara Körmendi	10 June 2009 (aged 17)	1.78 m	40	8	(Hungary) Győri Audi ETO KC
39	CB	Réka Kis	1 May 2009 (aged 17)	1.70 m	21	4	(Hungary) Debreceni VSC
42	LB	Nikol Litschauer	20 June 2008 (aged 18)	1.77 m	40	5	(Hungary) Debreceni VSC
48	CB	Bianka Nagy	8 January 2008 (aged 18)	1.74 m	6	5	(Hungary) Győri Audi ETO KC
64	P	Kata Kollár	2 February 2008 (aged 18)	1.77 m	8	2	(Hungary) NEKA
84	P	Villő Kányai	18 March 2008 (aged 18)	1.76 m	30	2	(Hungary) Győri Audi ETO KC
90	GK	Vivien Tábit	2 February 2009 (aged 17)	1.80 m	25	9	(Hungary) Debreceni VSC

=== Sweden ===
The final squad was announced on 23 June 2026.

Head coach: Frenne Båverud

No.	Pos.	Name	Date of birth (age)	Height	App.	Goals	Club
1	GK	Erica Andrew	6 November 2008 (aged 17)	1.72 m	13	0	(Sweden) IFK Tumba
2	LB	Tuva Schmidinger	8 March 2008 (aged 18)	1.69 m	13	33	(Sweden) IK Sävehof
4	LW	Alma Karlsson	6 April 2009 (aged 17)	1.82 m	0	0	(Sweden) Lugi HF
5	P	Nora Linder	4 September 2008 (aged 17)	1.79 m	21	37	(Sweden) IK Sävehof
6	P	Josefine Koch	31 August 2009 (aged 16)	1.81 m	0	0	(Sweden) IFK Tumba
8	RW	Isabella Herlitz	30 July 2008 (aged 17)	1.64 m	24	65	(Sweden) Skuru IK
9	RW	Thea Lilja	18 June 2008 (aged 18)	1.64 m	6	9	(Sweden) HF Karlskrona
10	LB	Irma Wong	2 July 2008 (aged 18)	1.85 m	16	41	(Sweden) Lödde Vikings
11	LB	Jenny Sjöstrand	5 May 2009 (aged 17)	1.78 m	3	5	(Sweden) IK Sävehof
12	GK	Emma Snö Jämtfalk	14 January 2008 (aged 18)	1.75 m	21	0	(Sweden) OV Helsingborg
13	LW	Maja Ström	18 June 2008 (aged 18)	1.67 m	11	11	(Sweden) Kärra HF
14	LW	Elsa Bergkvist	6 May 2008 (aged 18)	1.75 m	21	32	(Sweden) HK Aranäs
16	GK	Sienna Karström	29 July 2009 (aged 17)	1.82 m	3	0	(Sweden) IK Sävehof
17	CB	Emelie Ejdeblad	13 October 2008 (aged 17)	1.72 m	0	0	(Sweden) IK Sävehof
19	LW	Lisa Elmblad	16 January 2008 (aged 18)	1.73 m	24	67	(Sweden) IFK Tumba
22	RW	Signe Granberg	20 September 2009 (aged 16)	1.72 m	0	0	(Sweden) IK Sävehof

=== Tunisia ===
The final squad was announced on 26 July 2026.

Head coach: Abdelmajid Gaddour

No.	Pos.	Name	Date of birth (age)	Height	App.	Goals	Club
4	P	Maysoun Chaaban	30 July 2008 (aged 17)	1.82 m	13	23	(Tunisia) ES Rajich
5	LW	Ons Lassoued	3 December 2008 (aged 17)	1.70 m	7	2	(Tunisia) Colombes sportives de la Manouba
6	LW	Nayrouz Ahmed	13 November 2008 (aged 17)	1.59 m	7	5	(Tunisia) Colombes sportives de la Manouba
7	RW	Chyma Rjoubi	21 January 2009 (aged 17)	1.65 m	0	0	(Tunisia) Mégrine SHBF
8	CB	Ons Slama	13 September 2008 (aged 17)	1.80 m	18	74	(Tunisia) RS Monastir
12	GK	Nada Hmaidi	13 November 2008 (aged 17)	1.85 m	0	0	(Tunisia) Association sportive Ennour de l'Ariana
16	GK	Ritej Ben El Ghali	4 March 2009 (aged 17)	1.78 m	11	0	(Tunisia) Association sportive féminine de Téboulba
17	P	Hidaya Bouslama	20 October 2008 (aged 17)	1.71 m	7	13	(Tunisia) ASF Hammamet
19	RW	Rahma Rebai	9 March 2009 (aged 17)	1.63 m	7	12	(Tunisia) Association sportive féminine de Mahdia
20	CB	Ines Megannem	12 July 2008 (aged 18)	1.63 m	7	4	(France) Paris 92
27	RB	Emna Bziouech	15 September 2009 (aged 16)	1.73 m	3	1	(Tunisia) El Menzah Sport
66	LB	Nour Khenissi	10 October 2008 (aged 17)	1.79 m	10	19	(Tunisia) Association sportive féminine de Téboulba
70	CB	Farah Badis	30 April 2008 (aged 18)	1.61 m	0	0	(Tunisia) ASF Tazarka
79	CB	Nour Ouni	23 December 2008 (aged 17)	1.65 m	33	140	(Tunisia) Club Africain
88	GK	Loujain Romene	14 May 2008 (aged 18)	1.74 m	13	0	(Tunisia) ASF Hammamet
99	LB	Khardani Asma	7 April 2009 (aged 17)	1.77 m	0	0	(Tunisia) ASF Hammamet

== Group F ==
=== China ===
The final squad was announced on 7 July 2026.

Head coach: Shen Qiang

No.	Pos.	Name	Date of birth (age)	Height	App.	Goals	Club
4	RW	Hu Rongyan	24 June 2010 (aged 16)	1.70 m	0	0	(China) Chinese National Club
6	RW	Fu Yujie	26 October 2009 (aged 16)	1.72 m	6	9	(China) Jiangsu Team
7	P	Liu Yutong	9 January 2008 (aged 18)	1.83 m	11	3	(China) Jiangsu Team
8	LB	Zhang Shuoyan	1 February 2009 (aged 17)	1.72 m	7	27	(China) Jiangsu Team
10	LW	Liu Yixuan	11 November 2008 (aged 17)	1.61 m	7	9	(China) An Hui
12	GK	Zhang Yuxin	16 November 2008 (aged 17)	1.75 m	0	0	(China) Jiangsu Team
16	GK	Yu Siqi	23 November 2008 (aged 17)	1.81 m	0	0	(China) An Hui
19	LB	Li Zifeng	17 March 2009 (aged 17)	1.76 m	0	0	(China) Jiangsu Team
22	LW	Sha Yiyao	9 August 2009 (aged 16)	1.70 m	7	11	(China) Jiangsu Team
23	CB	Zhang Jingwen	28 May 2009 (aged 17)	1.66 m	14	16	(China) Jiangsu Team
24	RB	Zhu Yifan	15 October 2009 (aged 16)	1.77 m	6	2	(China) Jiangsu Team
25	RB	Fu Zhaojun	4 January 2009 (aged 17)	1.66 m	0	0	(China) Jiangsu Team
30	RB	Sun Ruixue	3 November 2010 (aged 15)	1.78 m	0	0	(China) Jiangsu Team
34	GK	Wang Xiaoyan	1 January 2008 (aged 18)	1.79 m	3	0	(China) Jiangsu Team
35	P	Zhou Zixuan	22 January 2009 (aged 17)	1.81 m	0	0	(China) Jiangsu Team
48	P	Wang Lehui	5 December 2008 (aged 17)	1.80 m	0	0	(China) An Hui
55	RB	Chen Le	31 May 2010 (aged 16)	1.63 m	0	0	(China) An Hui
69	LB	Lu Ruihan	27 August 2009 (aged 16)	1.74 m	0	0	(China) Jiangsu Team

=== Kazakhstan ===
The final squad was announced on 27 July 2026.

Head coach: Almaz Kozhamuratov

No.	Pos.	Name	Date of birth (age)	Height	App.	Goals	Club
3	P	Alina Voloshina	31 March 2010 (aged 16)	1.72 m	7	14	(Kazakhstan) KGU Pavlodar Special Youth Olympic Reserve School
7	RW	Xeniya Mikheyeva	1 February 2010 (aged 16)	1.65 m	7	37	(Kazakhstan) Specialized Youth Sports School of Olympic Reserve
9	LB	Nurdana Kyrgyzbay	16 March 2010 (aged 16)	1.69 m	19	132	(Kazakhstan) Specialized Youth Sports School of Olympic Reserve
13	LB	Anzhelika Orlovskaya	30 June 2010 (aged 16)	1.82 m	19	56	(Kazakhstan) Specialized Youth Sports School of Olympic Reserve
14	LB	Anastassiya Demidenko	29 June 2010 (aged 16)	1.84 m	0	0	(Kazakhstan) Specialized Youth Sports School of Olympic Reserve
17	CB	Tomiris Kelimberdi	18 April 2009 (aged 17)	1.67 m	6	0	(Kazakhstan) Youth Sports School, Kandyagash
23	GK	Kyzzhibek Galym	23 June 2008 (aged 18)	1.73 m	2	0	(Kazakhstan) Kaysar Club
24	LW	Almira Kadirzhanova	17 June 2010 (aged 16)	1.60 m	6	34	(Kazakhstan) Youth Sports School, Kandyagash
33	RB	Banu Kopzhan	4 January 2008 (aged 18)	1.71 m	25	45	(Kazakhstan) Kaysar Club
66	P	Valeriya Popova	30 June 2009 (aged 17)	1.75 m	0	0	(Kazakhstan) Handball club "Altai"
77	RW	Alita Semenova	27 December 2008 (aged 17)	1.70 m	0	0	(Kazakhstan) Specialized Youth Sports School of Olympic Reserve
84	GK	Damira Askhatkyzy	27 October 2009 (aged 16)	1.76 m	0	0	(Kazakhstan) Handball club "Altai"
88	RB	Darya Glukhikh	17 March 2009 (aged 17)	1.73 m	0	0	(Kazakhstan) Handball club "Altai"
96	LW	Balgyn Abibulla	19 September 2008 (aged 17)	1.68 m	13	24	(Kazakhstan) Specialized Youth Sports School of Olympic Reserve
99	CB	Olga Kuryerova	29 April 2010 (aged 16)	1.73 m	7	18	(Kazakhstan) Specialized Youth Sports School of Olympic Reserve

=== Romania ===
The final squad was announced on 21 July 2026.

Head coach: Victorina Bora

No.	Pos.	Name	Date of birth (age)	Height	App.	Goals	Club
4	LB	Maria Sprîncenatu	12 January 2009 (aged 17)	1.69 m	10	15	(Romania) CSM București
5	CB	Nicol Almășan	9 November 2008 (aged 17)	1.74 m	1	1	(Romania) CS Rapid București
6	RW	Diana Lefter	20 February 2008 (aged 18)	1.70 m	40	98	(Romania) HC Dunărea Brăila
8	CB	Delia Roșu	8 March 2008 (aged 18)	1.73 m	35	90	(Romania) HC Dunărea Brăila
9	RW	Sara Istrate	23 October 2008 (aged 17)	1.72 m	30	110	(Romania) HC Dunărea Brăila
10	CB	Maria Petrache	24 January 2009 (aged 17)	1.78 m	20	28	(Romania) CSM București
11	RB	Monica Scarlat	1 March 2008 (aged 18)	1.83 m	30	64	(Romania) HC Dunărea Brăila
12	GK	Ariana Ioniță	12 February 2009 (aged 17)	1.79 m	15	1	(Romania) CSM Corona Brașov
15	CB	Diana Sălăjan	29 November 2008 (aged 17)	1.72 m	1	1	(Romania) HC Zalău
16	GK	Arianna Ardeleanul	26 July 2009 (aged 17)	1.77 m	40	6	(Romania) HC Dunărea Brăila
19	RW	Maria Rusu	23 March 2008 (aged 18)	1.75 m	30	80	(Romania) CS Rapid București
21	LW	Daria Comendant	17 September 2008 (aged 17)	1.64 m	1	1	(Romania) HC Dunărea Brăila
22	P	Denisa Donache	23 May 2008 (aged 18)	1.72 m	1	1	(Romania) ACS Olympic RFH
23	P	Roberta Manea	23 March 2008 (aged 18)	1.78 m	25	30	(Romania) CS Rapid București
28	P	Diana Băiasu	13 May 2009 (aged 17)	1.73 m	12	12	(Romania) CSM Corona Brașov
74	GK	Elena Coșerea Pîtiu	24 September 2008 (aged 17)	1.82 m	25	1	(Romania) CSM București
88	RB	Agata Stoican	30 June 2008 (aged 18)	1.79 m	40	160	(Romania) CSM Corona Brașov
99	LW	Giulya Puiu	5 July 2009 (aged 17)	1.68 m	1	1	(Romania) SCM Râmnicu Vâlcea

=== Uruguay ===
The final squad was announced on 12 May 2026.

Head coach: Gerónimo Goyoaga

No.	Pos.	Name	Date of birth (age)	Height	App.	Goals	Club
1	GK	Valentina Champret	28 November 2008 (aged 17)	1.60 m	30	0	(Uruguay) Cevven
2	LB	Fiorella Olmos	15 June 2008 (aged 18)	1.73 m	15	62	(Uruguay) Cevven
3	LW	Florencia Benítez	21 September 2009 (aged 16)	1.73 m	40	300	(Uruguay) Cevven
5	P	Carmela Fernández	27 March 2008 (aged 18)	1.79 m	15	80	(Uruguay) Scuola Italiana di Montevideo
8	CB	Josefina Henaise	16 April 2008 (aged 18)	1.60 m	20	85	(Uruguay) Unión SRS
10	LB	Melina Pérez	30 December 2009 (aged 16)	1.75 m	1	10	(Uruguay) Unión SRS
12	RW	Priscila Rojo	12 August 2008 (aged 17)	1.66 m	36	200	(Uruguay) CA Peñarol
14	RB	Fiorella Vidal	22 May 2008 (aged 18)	1.75 m	12	18	(Uruguay) Club Banco República
16	RB	Federica Carbajal	16 July 2008 (aged 18)	1.68 m	5	6	(Uruguay) Club Pontevedres
20	CB	Maria Amado	12 April 2009 (aged 17)	1.74 m	0	0	(Uruguay) Club Malvín
22	P	Antonella Martí	12 March 2010 (aged 16)	1.75 m	9	43	(Uruguay) Club Malvín
23	LW	Fiorella Azurica	21 May 2008 (aged 18)	1.78 m	10	20	(Uruguay) Scuola Italiana di Montevideo
24	P	Serena Epherre	20 April 2009 (aged 17)	1.73 m	18	28	(Uruguay) Unión SRS
29	RW	Joaquina Testorelli	3 August 2009 (aged 16)	1.68 m	5	12	(Uruguay) Club Pontevedres
33	RB	Julietta Villar	31 July 2009 (aged 16)	1.64 m	40	203	(Uruguay) Cevven
34	LW	Isabella Leita	29 August 2010 (aged 15)	1.71 m	25	70	(Uruguay) Club Malvín
77	GK	Ivana Viñas	31 October 2009 (aged 16)	1.65 m	8	0	(Uruguay) Cevven

== Group G ==
=== Angola ===
The final squad was announced on 27 July 2026.

Head coach: Kátia Santos

No.	Pos.	Name	Date of birth (age)	Height	App.	Goals	Club
4	LW	Endrivania Paulo	30 March 2009 (aged 17)	1.66 m	0	0	(Angola) CD Primeiro de Agosto
6	LB	Benilde Soares	19 March 2008 (aged 18)	1.60 m	0	0	(Angola) Clube Nacional de Benguela
7	CB	Carolina Henrique	20 February 2008 (aged 18)	1.70 m	0	0	(Angola) Clube Nacional de Benguela
8	LW	Domingas Bande	8 March 2008 (aged 18)	1.71 m	0	0	(Angola) CD Primeiro de Agosto
9	LB	Conceição Alexandre	13 April 2010 (aged 16)	1.50 m	0	0	(Angola) Atlético Petróleos de Luanda
10	RW	Elisa Kaneculo	28 March 2009 (aged 17)	1.65 m	9	12	(Angola) Pérola Baía Farta
11	P	Germana Lubiengue	10 June 2008 (aged 18)	1.59 m	0	0	(Angola) CD Primeiro de Agosto
12	GK	Analia Bizerra	4 August 2008 (aged 17)	1.83 m	0	0	(Angola) Atlético Petróleos de Luanda
13	LB	Jacilda Januario	9 August 2009 (aged 16)	1.72 m	0	0	(Angola) Casa do Pessoal do Porto do Lobito
14	P	Tulueque Carlos	25 December 2008 (aged 17)	1.65 m	0	0	(Angola) Atlético Petróleos de Luanda
15	RB	Jordania Kinzanga	22 July 2010 (aged 16)	1.67 m	0	0	(Angola) CD Primeiro de Agosto
16	GK	Katila Sala	4 April 2008 (aged 18)	1.58 m	0	0	(Angola) CD Primeiro de Agosto
17	CB	Natalia Garcia	22 August 2008 (aged 17)	1.73 m	0	0	(Angola) CD Primeiro de Agosto
77	RB	Isabel Ambrosio	24 March 2008 (aged 18)	1.69 m	6	12	(Angola) CD Primeiro de Agosto
88	RB	Alicia Bernardo	25 April 2009 (aged 17)	1.67 m	0	0	(Angola) CD Primeiro de Agosto

=== Brazil ===
The final squad was announced on 28 July 2026.

Head coach: Mauricio Antonucci

No.	Pos.	Name	Date of birth (age)	Height	App.	Goals	Club
2	CB	Luiza Patelli	21 February 2008 (aged 18)	1.67 m	0	0	(Brazil) EC Pinheiros
4	LB	Isadora Pessatto	31 March 2008 (aged 18)	1.73 m	0	0	(Brazil) EC Pinheiros
5	RW	Beatriz Silva	3 December 2008 (aged 17)	1.65 m	0	0	(Brazil) EC Pinheiros
6	CB	Beatriz Santos	4 October 2008 (aged 17)	1.60 m	0	0	(Brazil) ATHB/Hand Torres
7	LW	Gabriela Medeiros	27 April 2009 (aged 17)	1.67 m	0	0	(Brazil) EC Pinheiros
8	LB	Mariana Silva	9 May 2009 (aged 17)	1.67 m	0	0	(Brazil) EC Pinheiros
9	P	Isabella Pessatto	31 March 2008 (aged 18)	1.74 m	0	0	(Brazil) EC Pinheiros
13	RB	Caroline Gomes	1 December 2008 (aged 17)	1.70 m	0	0	(Brazil) EC Pinheiros
14	P	Ana Silva	18 January 2009 (aged 17)	1.80 m	0	0	(Brazil) Clube Português do Recife
15	CB	Giovanna Tavares	16 April 2009 (aged 17)	1.68 m	5	0	(Portugal) CSS Pinhal de Frades
16	GK	Camila Wyden	6 March 2008 (aged 18)	1.80 m	0	0	(Brazil) EC Pinheiros
22	P	Lorena Stefani	22 December 2009 (aged 16)	1.73 m	0	0	(Brazil) AHI/FMEL/Itajai
24	LW	Ana Paula	10 June 2009 (aged 17)	1.63 m	0	0	(Brazil) AABB Balneario Camboriú
27	RW	Yasmin Nascimento	13 June 2008 (aged 18)	1.60 m	0	0	(Brazil) Clube Português do Recife
31	RB	Brenda Mendes	31 January 2008 (aged 18)	1.65 m	4	9	(Brazil) SEL/FADENP/São José dos Campos
37	LB	Paola Oliveira	10 August 2009 (aged 16)	1.72 m	6	3	(Brazil) AHI/FMEL/Itajai
38	RB	Jennyfer Carvalho	20 December 2009 (aged 16)	1.62 m	0	0	(Brazil) SESI 14
77	GK	Aylla Rocha	24 September 2009 (aged 16)	1.73 m	0	0	(Brazil) EC Pinheiros

=== Japan ===
The final squad was announced on 29 July 2026.

Head coach: (South Korea) Jang So-hee

No.	Pos.	Name	Date of birth (age)	Height	App.	Goals	Club
4	RB	Hana Wakayama	17 August 2008 (aged 17)	1.68 m	0	0	(Japan) Chiharadai High School
7	P	Cocomi Takeuchi	4 June 2008 (aged 18)	1.70 m	0	0	(Japan) Showa Gakuin High School
8	P	Honoka Uchiyama	13 February 2009 (aged 17)	1.63 m	5	20	(Japan) Chiharadai High School
11	CB	Hina Miura	31 July 2008 (aged 17)	1.58 m	5	29	(Japan) Luther Senior High School
13	GK	Oto Sasaki	28 December 2008 (aged 17)	1.72 m	5	0	(Japan) Showa Gakuin High School
14	RB	Aika Ito	14 June 2009 (aged 17)	1.64 m	0	0	(Japan) Mie Prefectural Inabe Sogo Gakuen High School
15	LB	Mizuki Kanayama	10 October 2008 (aged 17)	1.66 m	0	0	(Japan) Kyoto Prefectural Rakuhoku High School
17	LW	Saho Saito	17 August 2009 (aged 16)	1.54 m	0	0	(Japan) Kobe Seijoh High School
18	LB	Rio Hamaguchi	21 October 2008 (aged 17)	1.70 m	5	14	(Japan) Showa Gakuin High School
20	P	Yukina Suzuki	2 January 2008 (aged 18)	1.66 m	0	0	(Japan) Kokushikan University
21	RB	Kotoko Nakaya	7 February 2008 (aged 18)	1.67 m	0	0	(Japan) Fuji University
24	RW	Riko Maeda	24 September 2009 (aged 16)	1.70 m	0	0	(Japan) Komatsu Municipal High School
25	GK	Yu Matsuura	30 October 2008 (aged 17)	1.72 m	5	0	(Japan) Takamatsu Commercial High School
26	RW	Asami Sakamoto	19 February 2009 (aged 17)	1.70 m	5	11	(Japan) Kyoto Prefectural Rakuhoku High School
27	LB	Kokomi Makino	12 February 2008 (aged 18)	1.65 m	5	17	(Japan) Kansai University
28	CB	Miina Nakasuji	20 March 2008 (aged 18)	1.65 m	5	26	(Japan) Prestige International Aranmare Toyama
33	GK	Rui Arakaki	3 March 2009 (aged 17)	1.77 m	5	0	(Japan) Urasoe High School
39	LW	Rinoa Nakagawa	20 August 2008 (aged 17)	1.61 m	5	20	(Japan) Chiharadai High School

=== Slovakia ===
The final squad was announced on 27 July 2026.

Head coach: Pavol Streicher

No.	Pos.	Name	Date of birth (age)	Height	App.	Goals	Club
1	GK	Anežka Stránska	15 April 2008 (aged 18)	1.73 m	27	0	(Germany) HSG Stuttgart-Metzingen
3	RW	Veronika Chrenková	29 July 2009 (aged 17)	1.74 m	10	7	(Slovakia) Iuventa Michalovce
4	CB	Viktória Benedigová	29 July 2008 (aged 18)	1.62 m	29	18	(Slovakia) Slovan Malá Fatra-HK Žilina
5	RW	Lujza Rozi Bölcskei	17 July 2008 (aged 18)	1.69 m	31	75	(Slovakia) HK Slovan Duslo Šaľa
7	LW	Scarlet Špendlová	2 September 2008 (aged 17)	1.65 m	29	54	(Slovakia) HK Slovan Duslo Šaľa
8	RB	Liliana Gogová	29 September 2008 (aged 17)	1.76 m	31	162	(Slovakia) ŠKP Topoľčany
9	LW	Eszter Komlós	4 November 2008 (aged 17)	1.68 m	31	79	(Slovakia) HC DAC Dunajská Streda
10	CB	Lucia Valientová	19 January 2009 (aged 17)	1.65 m	25	25	(Slovakia) MHK Bytča
11	CB	Barbora Karkušová	30 January 2008 (aged 18)	1.67 m	31	134	(Slovakia) Tatran Stupava
13	RW	Laura Kurňavová	28 May 2008 (aged 18)	1.66 m	14	11	(Slovakia) HK Slovan Duslo Šaľa
14	P	Kristína Görögová	19 June 2008 (aged 18)	1.78 m	24	29	(Slovakia) MHK Bytča
16	GK	Kristina Kubicinova	23 January 2008 (aged 18)	1.77 m	22	0	(Slovakia) Iuventa Michalovce
17	RB	Michaela Ďuranová	29 May 2008 (aged 18)	1.70 m	6	17	(Slovakia) Slovan Malá Fatra-HK Žilina
18	P	Anna Šubjaková	22 January 2009 (aged 17)	1.74 m	30	27	(Slovakia) Slovan Malá Fatra-HK Žilina
19	P	Viktória Cseh	28 October 2008 (aged 17)	1.73 m	18	5	(Slovakia) HC DAC Dunajská Streda
22	GK	Ema Augeustinova	28 December 2009 (aged 16)	1.72 m	27	0	(Slovakia) MHK Bytča
24	LB	Kristína Sekáčová	29 April 2009 (aged 17)	1.76 m	23	29	(Slovakia) MHK Bytča
83	LW	Sofia Némethová	27 September 2010 (aged 15)	1.68 m	0	0	(Slovakia) HC DAC Dunajská Streda

== Group H ==
=== Algeria ===
The final squad was announced on 28 July 2026.

Head coach: Nadia Benzine

No.	Pos.	Name	Date of birth (age)	Height	App.	Goals	Club
4	LB	Eliana Bouda	12 August 2009 (aged 16)	1.74 m	0	0	(Algeria) MF Akbou
5	CB	Cerine Yala	22 January 2009 (aged 17)	1.62 m	0	0	(Algeria) OC Aintaya
6	RB	Amira Sid	31 July 2009 (aged 16)	1.74 m	5	3	(Algeria) HBC El-Biar
9	CB	Maria Benflis	27 December 2008 (aged 17)	1.60 m	0	0	(Algeria) HBC El-Biar
10	CB	Dihia Amriche	3 May 2008 (aged 18)	1.73 m	0	0	(Algeria) Ess Akbou
12	LW	Darine Tirsatine	4 December 2008 (aged 17)	1.60 m	0	0	(Algeria) Club féminin de Boumerdes
13	LB	Aya Adda	24 September 2008 (aged 17)	1.70 m	0	0	(Algeria) EB Saida
16	GK	Aya Sid	16 November 2009 (aged 16)	1.75 m	0	0	(Algeria) HBC El-Biar
17	LW	Yasmina Halou	21 August 2008 (aged 17)	1.80 m	0	0	(Algeria) Union Sportive Akbou
20	LB	Yasmine Khodja	4 June 2008 (aged 18)	1.75 m	0	0	(Algeria) Club Sportif Mouloud Mammeri Tizi Ouzou
23	LW	Anais Chebli	8 April 2009 (aged 17)	1.54 m	0	0	(Algeria) Ess Akbou
24	GK	Nermine Bennour	26 June 2008 (aged 18)	1.81 m	0	0	(Algeria) AOSAwzellaguen Handball
29	LB	Louiza Djelouah	23 February 2009 (aged 17)	1.72 m	2	5	(Algeria) Union Sportive Akbou
30	LW	Leticia Lahlah	28 July 2010 (aged 16)	1.68 m	0	0	(Algeria) Ess Akbou
31	LB	Kinda Mansouri	29 January 2008 (aged 18)	1.72 m	7	14	(Algeria) FS Constantine
38	LW	Malak Salmi	4 August 2009 (aged 16)	1.64 m	2	10	(Algeria) HBC El-Biar
41	RW	Lamis Misraoui	31 May 2009 (aged 17)	1.60 m	0	0	(Algeria) HBC El-Biar
61	GK	Hadil Ydjedd	21 December 2010 (aged 15)	1.70 m	0	0	(Algeria) Ess Akbou

=== Serbia ===
The final squad was announced on 6 July 2026.

Head coach: Vesna Bojković

No.	Pos.	Name	Date of birth (age)	Height	App.	Goals	Club
1	GK	Anja Petrović	5 November 2008 (aged 17)	1.70 m	0	0	(Serbia) Železničar Inđija
3	CB	Tamara Milosavljević	6 December 2008 (aged 17)	1.78 m	0	0	(Serbia) ŽRK Radnički Belgrade
4	RW	Kalina Telečki	10 December 2009 (aged 16)	1.67 m	0	0	(Serbia) ŽRK Temerin
10	LB	Anastasija Miladinović	3 September 2009 (aged 16)	1.72 m	0	0	(Serbia) ŽORK Jagodina
11	LW	Iva Lacković	1 April 2008 (aged 18)	1.74 m	7	4	(Serbia) ŽRK Medicinar
13	P	Andrea Filipović	29 August 2008 (aged 17)	1.78 m	0	0	(Serbia) ŽRK Topličanin
15	LB	Jelena Mirković	9 March 2008 (aged 18)	1.78 m	0	0	(Serbia) RK Toplicanin
16	GK	Dunja Čović	22 November 2008 (aged 17)	1.75 m	12	2	(Serbia) ŽRK Temerin
17	LW	Janja Andrić	7 November 2008 (aged 17)	1.70 m	0	0	(Serbia) RK Radnički Ćuprija
18	CB	Lena Andrić	26 February 2008 (aged 18)	1.69 m	0	0	(Serbia) ŽRK Metalac
19	RW	Isidora Bajić	16 October 2008 (aged 17)	1.61 m	0	0	(Serbia) SU ŽRK Crvena Zvezda
20	RB	Emilija Damnjanović	8 November 2008 (aged 17)	1.72 m	0	0	(Serbia) RK Radnički Ćuprija
25	RB	Nina Nestorović	13 August 2009 (aged 16)	1.71 m	0	0	(Serbia) ŽRK Metalac
28	CB	Dunja Valdevit	28 August 2009 (aged 16)	1.67 m	0	0	(Serbia) RK Junior
31	GK	Anđela Nestorović	24 September 2010 (aged 15)	1.72 m	0	0	(Serbia) ŽRK Metalac
33	RB	Anastasija Radanović	30 August 2009 (aged 16)	1.75 m	14	22	(Serbia) ORK Spartak
64	RB	Jelena Vidojević	4 April 2008 (aged 18)	1.73 m	0	0	(Serbia) RK Partizan
72	P	Tijana Ilić	29 December 2008 (aged 17)	1.75 m	0	0	(Serbia) ŽRK Medicinar

=== Slovenia ===
The final squad was announced on 26 July 2026.

Head coach: Jernej Rantah

No.	Pos.	Name	Date of birth (age)	Height	App.	Goals	Club
3	P	Sarah Pilih Derča	2 February 2008 (aged 18)	1.79 m	10	10	(Slovenia) RK Celje Pivovarna Laško
4	P	Pia Blagus	29 May 2008 (aged 18)	1.72 m	0	0	(Slovenia) ŽRK Ptuj
5	LB	Lana Markežič	25 March 2009 (aged 17)	1.77 m	10	21	(Slovenia) ŽRK Izola
6	CB	Zala Petek	16 October 2008 (aged 17)	1.72 m	8	9	(Slovenia) ŽRK Z'dežele
7	P	Sandra Gajić	28 January 2009 (aged 17)	1.72 m	10	16	(Slovenia) RK Krim Mercator
10	CB	Lija Koželj	19 May 2009 (aged 17)	1.72 m	10	12	(Slovenia) ŽRK Izola
11	LB	Liana Vuković	1 September 2008 (aged 17)	1.78 m	0	0	(Slovenia) RK Ljubljana
12	GK	Sara Selčan	3 January 2008 (aged 18)	1.71 m	10	0	(Slovenia) ŽRK Z'dežele
13	CB	Lana Dudek	26 February 2008 (aged 18)	1.65 m	0	0	(Slovenia) ŽRK Ptuj
14	RB	Katja Štukelj	17 April 2009 (aged 17)	1.78 m	10	29	(Slovenia) ŽRK Krka Novo Mesto
15	CB	Keja Poznik	1 September 2008 (aged 17)	1.65 m	0	0	(Slovenia) RK Ljubljana
16	GK	Nika Kuri	21 April 2008 (aged 18)	1.74 m	0	0	(Slovenia) ŽRK Ptuj
17	RW	Elisabeth Krulc	14 October 2008 (aged 17)	1.69 m	8	10	(Slovenia) ŽRK Izola
18	LB	Zoja Kravanja	19 August 2009 (aged 16)	1.81 m	0	0	(Slovenia) RK Krim Mercator
19	RW	Pia Zakrajšek	16 September 2010 (aged 15)	1.63 m	0	0	(Slovenia) RK Sevnica
20	RW	Brina Mehlin	19 October 2008 (aged 17)	1.72 m	8	13	(Slovenia) RK Ljubljana
23	LW	Fiona Ferlin	18 November 2008 (aged 17)	1.70 m	0	0	(Slovenia) ŽRK Velenje
24	LW	Pia Klun	27 May 2008 (aged 18)	1.66 m	0	0	(Slovenia) ŽRK Millennium

=== Switzerland ===
The final squad was announced on 28 July 2026.

Head coach: Jürgen Fleischmann

No.	Pos.	Name	Date of birth (age)	Height	App.	Goals	Club
1	GK	Larissa Trümpler	11 May 2008 (aged 18)	1.79 m	20	0	(Switzerland) LK Zug
5	RB	Aita Wegmann	17 December 2009 (aged 16)	1.72 m	18	27	(Switzerland) LK Zug
6	LB	Sophia Steiger	25 August 2009 (aged 16)	1.78 m	4	1	(Switzerland) Spono Eagles
7	CB	Lisa Herger	18 April 2008 (aged 18)	1.70 m	29	126	(Switzerland) Spono Eagles
9	LW	Lauryn Mierzwa	29 December 2009 (aged 16)	1.70 m	28	141	(Switzerland) LC Brühl
11	CB	Noëlle Osterwalder	11 March 2008 (aged 18)	1.73 m	49	171	(Switzerland) Yellow Winterthur
12	GK	Leandra Setz	24 April 2008 (aged 18)	1.62 m	28	0	(Switzerland) Spono Eagles
14	LW	Elina Egli	12 November 2008 (aged 17)	1.66 m	9	8	(Switzerland) Spono Eagles
15	RW	Emma Heer	29 July 2008 (aged 18)	1.68 m	28	61	(Switzerland) Yellow Winterthur
16	GK	Jael Billeter	24 April 2008 (aged 18)	1.77 m	32	1	(Switzerland) HV Herzogenbuchsee
17	P	Cristina Hofstetter	8 September 2008 (aged 17)	1.64 m	30	86	(Switzerland) LC Brühl
18	LB	Nora Heer	5 February 2008 (aged 18)	1.72 m	5	15	(Switzerland) Yellow Winterthur
20	P	Haylie Wildhaber	7 January 2009 (aged 17)	1.72 m	29	14	(Switzerland) Spono Eagles
21	RW	Sophia Rhyner	21 October 2009 (aged 16)	1.70 m	15	25	(Switzerland) LC Brühl
23	LB	Sajana Leupi	2 May 2009 (aged 17)	1.71 m	23	14	(Switzerland) GC Amicitia Zürich
38	RB	Nora Emmenegger	10 January 2008 (aged 18)	1.68 m	53	173	(Switzerland) Spono Eagles
48	RB	Amy Koch	31 October 2008 (aged 17)	1.64 m	20	23	(Switzerland) GC Amicitia Zürich
