= Terpezița (river) =

- Location within Romania

Location
- Country: Romania
- Counties: Dolj County
- Villages: Știubei, Terpezița, Vârvor

Physical characteristics
- Mouth: Desnățui
  - location: Vârvor
  - coordinates: 44.2136°N 23.5943°E
- Length: 46 km (29 mi)
- Basin size: 193 km^{2} (75 sq mi)

Basin features
- Progression: Desnățui→ Danube→ Black Sea

The Terpezița is a left tributary of the river Desnățui in Romania. It discharges into the Desnățui near Vârvor. Its length is 46 km (29 mi) and its basin size is 193 km^{2} (75 sq mi).
