= Băldal =

- Location within Romania

Location
- Country: Romania
- Counties: Dolj County
- Villages: Perișor, Întorsura

Physical characteristics
- Mouth: Desnățui
  - coordinates: 44.0513°N 23.6318°E
- Length: 30 km (19 mi)
- Basin size: 178 km^{2} (69 sq mi)

Basin features
- Progression: Desnățui→ Danube→ Black Sea

The Băldal (also: Jivan) is a right tributary of the river Desnățui in Romania. It flows into the Desnățui near Cerăt. Its length is 30 km (19 mi) and its basin size is 178 km^{2} (69 sq mi).
