= Urzicuța =

- Commune
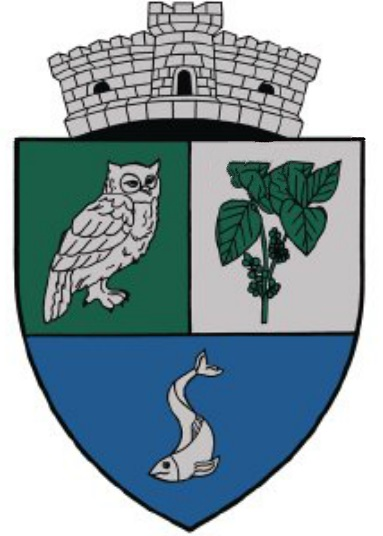
- Coat of arms

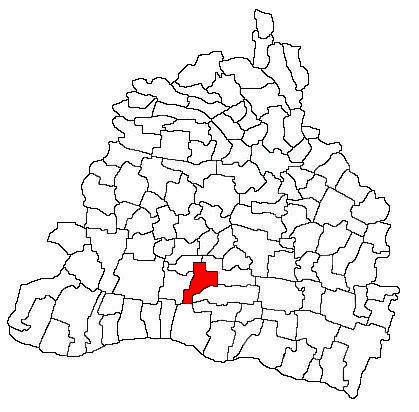
- Location in Dolj County

- Location in Romania
- Coordinates: 44°1′N 23°33′E
- Country: Romania
- County: Dolj

Government
  - Mayor (2020–2024): Florentin Panduru (PNL)
- Area: 60.72 km^{2} (23.44 sq mi)
- Highest elevation: 40 m (130 ft)
- Lowest elevation: 25 m (82 ft)
- Population (2021-12-01): 2,870
  - Density: 47.3/km^{2} (122/sq mi)
- Time zone: UTC+02:00 (EET)
  - Summer (DST): UTC+03:00 (EEST)
- Postal code: 207600
- Vehicle reg.: DJ

Urzicuța is a commune in Dolj County, Oltenia, Romania with a population of 3,154 people. It is composed of two villages, Urzica Mare and Urzicuța.

The commune is located in the south-central part of the county, 17 km (11 mi) from the city of Băilești, 20 km (12 mi) from the town of Segarcea, and 50 km (31 mi) from the county seat, Craiova. It neighbors Giurgița commune to the north and east, Bârca commune to the east, Bistreț commune to the south, Afumați commune to the south and west, and Siliștea Crucii commune to the west. Urzicuța is traversed by county road DJ561A

== Natives ==
- Victorina Bora (b. 1972), handball player
- Nicolae Zamfir (b. 1967), footballer
