= Buzat =

- Location within Romania

Location
- Country: Romania
- Counties: Dolj County
- Villages: Giurgița

Physical characteristics
- Mouth: Desnățui
  - coordinates: 43.9976°N 23.5988°E
- Length: 22 km (14 mi)
- Basin size: 165 km^{2} (64 sq mi)

Basin features
- Progression: Desnățui→ Danube→ Black Sea

The Buzat is a left tributary of the river Desnățui in Romania. It flows into the Desnățui near Urzica Mare. Its length is 22 km (14 mi) and its basin size is 165 km^{2} (64 sq mi).
