= Lee Seol =

- Hangul: 이설
- RR: I Seol
- MR: I Sŏl

Lee Seol (Korean: 이설) may refer to:

- Lee Seol (actress, born 1993), South Korean actress
- Lee Seol (YouTuber) (born 1992), South Korean online streamer and YouTuber
- Lee Seol (actress, born 1989), South Korean actress
