= Știubei =

Ştiubei may refer to several places in Romania:

- Ştiubei, a village in Râmnicelu Commune, Buzău County
- Ştiubei, a village in Vela Commune, Dolj County
