= Suharu =

Suharu may refer to several villages in Romania:

- Suharu, a village in Vela Commune, Dolj County
- Suharu, a village in Căzănești Commune, Mehedinți County
