= Nicolae Zamfir (footballer, born 1967) =

Romanian footballer

Personal information
- Date of birth: 26 April 1967 (age 59)
- Place of birth: Urzicuța, Romania
- Position: Centre back

Senior career*
Years	Team	Apps	(Gls)
1984–1995	Universitatea Craiova (Note: The statistics for the 1985–86 and 1986–87 Divizia A seasons are unavailable.)	163	(6)
1995–1996	Alki Larnaca	26	(2)
2003	B36 Tórshavn		
Total		189	(8)

International career
1991–1992	Romania	4	(0)
- * Club domestic league appearances and goals

Nicolae Zamfir (born 26 April 1967) is a Romanian former football defender.

== International career ==
Nicolae Zamfir played four friendly games for Romania, making his debut in 2–0 away victory against Spain.

== Honours ==
Universitatea Craiova

- Divizia A: 1990–91
- Cupa României: 1990–91

FC U Craiova

- Cupa României: 1992–93
