= The Cursed (TV series) =

2020 South Korean television series

- Promotional poster
- Hangul: 방법
- Lit.: Method
- RR: Bangbeop
- MR: Pangbŏp
- Genre: Thriller; Mystery; Horror
- Created by: Studio Dragon
- Written by: Yeon Sang-ho
- Directed by: Kim Yong-wan
- Starring: Uhm Ji-won; Jung Ji-so; Sung Dong-il; Jo Min-su
- Music by: Kim Dong-wook
- Country of origin: South Korea
- Original language: Korean
- No. of episodes: 12

Production
- Executive producer: Jang Jung-do
- Producer: Lee Jung-mook
- Running time: 60 minutes
- Production company: Lezhin Studio

Original release
- Network: tvN
- Release: February 10 – March 17, 2020

The Cursed (Korean: 방법; RR: Bangbeop; lit. 'Method') is a 2020 South Korean television series starring Uhm Ji-won, Jung Ji-so, Sung Dong-il, and Jo Min-su. It aired on tvN every Monday and Tuesday at 21:30 (KST) from February 10 to March 17, 2020.

Screenwriter Yeon Sang-ho said that he would "go on with season 2 if the viewing rate reaches 3%". The series was followed by a film, The Cursed: Dead Man's Prey, in July 2021.

== Synopsis ==
The Cursed is about a teenage girl who has the ability to bring death by using names, photos and belongings, and a just social issues reporter, fighting against the massive evil hidden behind an IT conglomerate.

== Cast ==
=== Main ===
- Uhm Ji-won as Im Jin-hee, reporter of the Ministry of Social Affairs.
  - Kim Joo-ah as young Im Jin-hee
- Jung Ji-so as Baek So-jin, high school student.
- Sung Dong-il as Jin Jong-hyun, forest chairman.
- Jo Min-su as Jin Kyung, shaman.
- Kim Shin-rok as Baek So-jin's mother

=== Supporting ===
- Kim Min-jae as Lee Hwan, Jin Jong-hyun's secretary.
- Jung Moon-sung as Jung Sung-joon, Jin-hee's husband.
- Kim In-kwon as Kim Pil-sung, private investigator.
- Lee Joong-ok as Chun Joo-bong
- Ko Kyu-pil as Tak Jung-hoon

=== Special appearances ===
- Choi Byung-mo as Kim Joo-hwan (Ep. 1)
- Kwon Yul as Lee Jung-hoon (Ep. 4)

== Viewership ==
The Cursed : South Korea viewers per episode (millions)

Season	Episode number												Average
Season	1	2	3	4	5	6	7	8	9	10	11	12	Average
1	0.543	0.549	0.790	0.802	0.760	0.865	1.039	1.265	1.333	1.532	1.315	1.717	1.043

Source: Audience measurement performed nationwide by Nielsen Korea.

Average TV viewership ratings
Ep.	Original broadcast date	Title	Average audience share (Nielsen Korea)	
Ep.	Original broadcast date	Title	Nationwide	Seoul
1	February 10, 2020	Performer of the Procedure	2.492%	2.210%
2	February 11, 2020	Mysterious Occurrence	2.514%	2.560%
3	February 17, 2020	The Cursed Forest	3.663%	4.440%
4	February 18, 2020	Boomerang Effect	3.535%	3.656%
5	February 24, 2020	Asin's Child Shaman	3.016%	3.051%
6	February 25, 2020	Jinkyung Corporation	3.592%	3.584%
7	March 2, 2020	Talisman	4.203%	4.073%
8	March 3, 2020	Sindorim	5.020%	5.509%
9	March 9, 2020	Possessed Buddha Statue	5.188%	5.726%
10	March 10, 2020	Big City Private Eye	6.099%	6.790%
11	March 16, 2020	Inugami	4.750%	5.341%
12	March 17, 2020	Jong Hyun	6.721%	7.329%
Average			4.233%	4.522%
The blue numbers represent the lowest ratings and the red numbers represent the highest ratings.; This series aired on a cable channel/pay TV which normally has a relatively smaller audience compared to free-to-air TV/public broadcasters (KBS, SBS, MBC and EBS).

== Awards and nominations ==
Year	Award	Category	Recipient	Result	Ref.
2020	56th Baeksang Arts Awards	Best New Actress (TV)	Jung Ji-so	Nominated	
2020	Asian Academy Creative Awards	Best Original Screenplay	Yeon Sang-ho	Won	
