= Kim Joo-ah =

South Korean actress (born 2004)

- Born: January 4, 2004 (age 22); Songpa District, Seoul, South Korea
- Occupation: Actress
- Years active: 2017–present
- Agent: Different Company
- Known for: The Cursed; All of Us Are Dead; Kim Min Young of the Report Card

Korean name
- Hangul: 김주아
- RR: Gim Jua
- MR: Kim Chua

Kim Joo-ah (Korean: 김주아; born January 4, 2004) is a South Korean actress. She is known for her roles in dramas The Cursed, Would You Like a Cup of Coffee?, and All of Us Are Dead. She also appeared in movies such as A Boy and Sungreen, LingLing, Almond: My Voice is Breaking, and Kim Min Young of the Report Card.

== Biography and career ==
Kim Joo-ah was born on January 4, 2004, in Songpa District, Seoul, South Korea. In 2017 she joined Different Company and she made her debut as a child actress in film Glimmering. After her debut as an actress she appeared in several dramas and in a number of films including The Cursed, Would You Like a Cup of Coffee?, All of Us Are Dead and The Mentalist. She also appeared in several films Almond: My Voice is Breaking, Herstory, LingLing and A Boy and Sungreen. She appeared in film Kim Min Young of the Report Card as Yoo Jung-hee the movie was shown at 22nd Jeonju International Film Festival which has received favorable reviews.

== Filmography ==
=== Television series ===
Year	Title	Role	Ref.
2020	The Cursed	Im Jin-hee	
2021	Would You Like a Cup of Coffee?	Seo Hye- ji	
2022	All of Us Are Dead	Yoon I-sak	
2022	The Mentalist	TBA	
2023	Daily Dose of Sunshine	Park Byeong-hui	
2025	Confidence Queen	Han Jae-hee	

=== Film ===
Year	Title		Role	Ref.
Year	English	Korean	Role	Ref.
2017	Glimmering	선아의 방	Seon-ah	
2017	Almond: My Voice is Breaking	변성기	Joo-ah	
2018	Her Bath	그녀의 욕조	Jin-ah	
2018	Herstory	허스토리	Kim Ju-ah	
2018	A Boy and Sungreen	보희와 녹양	Nok-yang	
2019	LingLing	링링	Jin-a	
2019	Knowingly Unknown	모르는 사이	Ye-shin	
2020	A Bedsore	욕창	Park Mi-ra	
2022	Kim Min Young of the Report Card	성적표의 김민영	Yoo Jung-hee	
