= Jung Ji-so =

South Korean actress (born 1999)

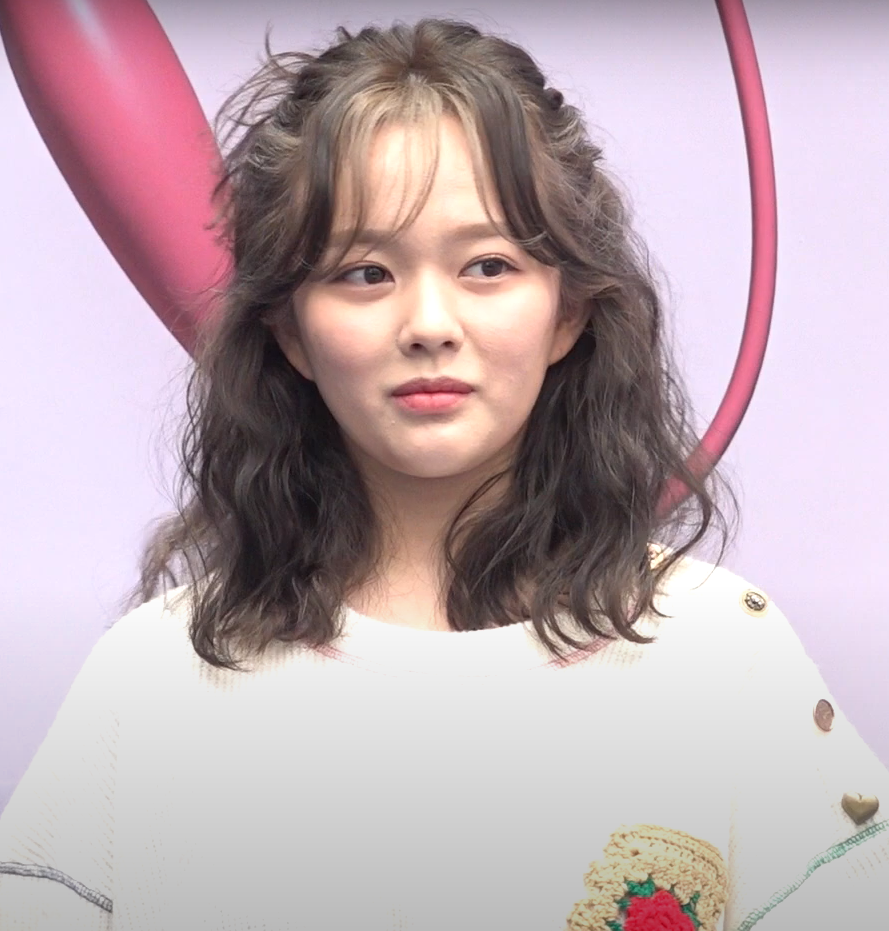
- Jung in March 2023
- Born: Hyun Seung-min; September 17, 1999 (age 27); Seongnam, South Korea
- Occupation: Actress
- Years active: 2012–present
- Agent: Bliss Entertainment

Korean name
- Hangul: 현승민
- RR: Hyeon Seungmin
- MR: Hyŏn Sŭngmin

Stage name
- Hangul: 정지소
- Hanja: 鄭知蘇
- RR: Jeong Jiso
- MR: Chŏng Chiso

Hyun Seung-min (Korean: 현승민; born September 17, 1999), known professionally as Jung Ji-so (정지소) is a South Korean actress. Hyun made her acting debut as a child actress in the 2012 television drama May Queen. She is best known internationally for her role as Park Da-hye in Parasite, which won the Palme d'Or at the Cannes Film Festival and the Academy Award for Best Picture. For her performance in the film, she won the Screen Actors Guild Award for Outstanding Performance by a Cast in a Motion Picture.

== Early life ==
Before her acting career, Hyun was a promising figure skater. She skated for six years, from second grade to her first year of middle school, and even won a gold medal at the Lotte Mayor's Cup Figure Skating Competition.

== Career ==
=== 2012–2019: Beginning as child actress and model ===
Hyun made her acting debut as a child actress in the 2012 television drama May Queen. In the series, she played the child version of In-hwa, the brash and affluent daughter portrayed by Son Eun-seo. She earned praise from the production staff for her impressive figure skating abilities, which she displayed in the show. She then appeared in the MBC morning drama It Was Love, portraying the young version of Kim Bo-kyung's character. She has also worked as a commercial model.

In 2013, Hyun took on the role of the young Samsaengi in the KBS drama TV Novel Samsaengi. She was praised by audiences for her natural dialect acting as she portrayed a character who lives bravely despite being treated as an outcast by her parents. She then appeared in The Blade and Petal as the daughter of Gil-bu (played by Yoo Jae-myung). For both roles, she won the Best Female Youth Acting Award at the 2013 KBS Drama Awards, sharing the honor with Kim Yoo-bin (Heaven's Order), Kim Hyun-soo (Good Doctor / The Emperor's Dream), Kim Hwan-hee (You're the Best, Lee Soon-shin), and Moon Ga-young (The King's Family).

That same year, she played the younger version of Ha Ji-won's character in the drama Empress Ki. She gained particular attention for her portrayal of the young Seung-nyang, who is forced to become strong to survive after witnessing her mother's death. Despite her brief appearance, she left a lasting impression and received praise from viewers.

In late 2013, Hyun was cast in Koo Hye-sun's third feature film, Daughter, which was released in 2014 and marked her cinematic debut. In the film, she played the young San-yi, a younger version of Koo Hye-sun's character. The psychological drama focuses on the conflict between a mother who uses corporal punishment and her struggling daughter.

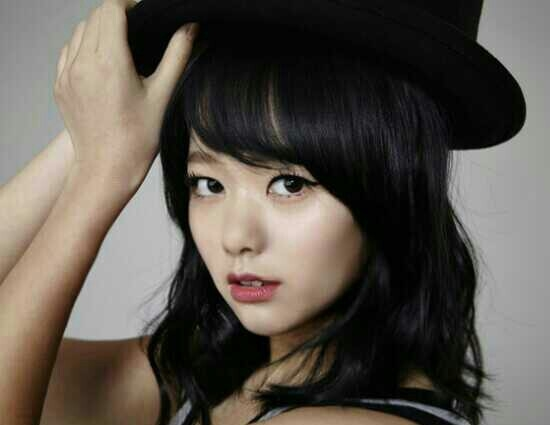
Hyun in 2014

Also in 2014, Hyun signed an exclusive contract with Better Entertainment. She was cast in the MBC drama My Spring Days, portraying Kang Pu-reun, the daughter of the character played by Kam Woo-sung. She received positive reviews for her role as a respectable girl who cares for her younger brother and father in place of her deceased mother.

She then auditioned for and won the role of Seon-yi Park Hoon-jung's film The Tiger (2015). Her character, who was in marriage talks with the main character, Seok-yi (played by Sung Yu-bin), since childhood, received attention for her use of a dialect and her deep acting. Also in 2015, Hyun acted as younger versions of Han Ji-min's character in Hyde, Jekyll, Me.

In 2016, Hyun acted as younger versions of Han Hyo-joo's character in W. She has since honed her acting skills through numerous dramas, including W, Beginning, Family Over Flowers, Hwajung, Spring Days in My Life, Flower of the Sword, Three Life, Empress Ki, and I Think I Loved You.

=== 2019–present: Transition from child actress and breakthrough ===
Hyun adopted her stage name at nineteen after considerable reflection, viewing it as a chance to start anew. The name "Jung Ji-soo" was chosen to honor her ten-year-old sister, who admired her greatly, and to express her desire to care for her. Her parents later gifted her the Chinese characters for "ji" (知), meaning "knowledge," and "so" (蘇), meaning "resurrection." Afterwards, Jung successfully passed three rounds of auditions for the role of Park Da-hye in Bong Joon-ho's film, Parasite. She later admitted that she had approached the audition without high expectations, which she believed helped her succeed. Before landing the role, she had faced a period of emotional distress due to failing numerous auditions and the extended hiatus from acting, which had led her to consider quitting the profession entirely. While Parasite went on to win the Palme d'Or at the Cannes Film Festival and the Academy Award for Best Picture, Jung was unable to attend the award ceremonies due to a scheduling conflict with her next project.

Following a successful audition with a 100:1 competition ratio, Jung was cast as the lead character, Baek So-jin, in the tvN drama The Cursed. This marked her first time in a main protagonist role in a series. Her character is a high school student with the ability to cause death using names, photos, and personal belongings. The drama, which also starred Uhm Ji-won, Sung Dong-il, and Jo Min-su, aired from February 10 to March 17, 2020. The series's screenwriter, Yeon Sang-ho, hinted at a possible second season if ratings exceeded 3%.

On July 16, 2020, it was announced that The Cursed would be adapted into a film titled The Cursed: Dead Man's Prey. Jung and Uhm Ji-won reprised their roles, with Oh Yoon-ah and Lee Seol joining the cast. The film, directed by Kim Yong-wan and written by Yeon Sang-ho, was produced by Climax Studio under the planning of Studio Dragon. Filming took place from September 9 to December 5, 2020. The film was released on July 28, 2021. It was also selected for the 'Korean Cinema Today - Panorama Section' at the 26th Busan International Film Festival and was screened on October 8, 2021. Additionally, it was invited to the 40th Brussels International Fantastic Film Festival and screened for its Belgian premiere on August 30, 2022.

In 2021, Jung starred as the main protagonist in Imitation, a series based on the webtoon of the same name, which aired on KBS2 from May 7 to July 23, 2021. Jung portrayed Lee Ma-ha, the center of the new girl group Tea Party. After her initial debut plans were canceled, she spent three years working various jobs before getting a second chance with Tea Party. Despite facing severe online criticism as she strives for success, she begins a secret relationship with Kwon Ryok (Lee Jun-young), a member of the top boy group Shax, a move that is forbidden for idols.

In 2022, Jung auditioned for the Netflix original series The Glory, written by renowned screenwriter Kim Eun-sook, and was cast as the teenage version of Moon Dong-eun, with the older version portrayed by Song Hye-kyo. Jung's performance was widely praised. She stated that she felt a strong sense of responsibility for the role, as the series was based on a true story, and paid meticulous attention to every detail, including facial expressions, breathing, and dialogue. During the filming of a scene where her character's skin is burned with a hair straightener, she described feeling the pain even though the device was not functional. In the same year, she reunited with Ha Ji-won and Sung Dong-il in the KBS2 drama Curtain Call. The series follows Yoo Jae-heon (Kang Ha-neul), an actor hired to pose as Ja Geum-soon's North Korean grandson, a wealthy hotel owner who was separated from her family during the Korean War. Jung appeared in a supporting role as Seo Yoon-hee, a theater actress who pretends to be Yoo Jae-heon's wife. Jung also auditioned for the MBC variety show Hangout with Yoo. On the show, she was selected as a member of the seasonal South Korean all-female supergroup WSG Wannabe. As part of the sub-unit Gaya-G, she and her fellow members earned their first music show win in Show! Music Core on July 23, 2022 for their digital single "At The Moment."

In 2024, she starred as the main protagonist in the KBS2 drama Who Is She. The series is a remake of the 2014 film Miss Granny and depicts the story of a 70-year-old grandmother, Oh Mal-soon, who suddenly transforms into her 20-year-old self. Jung portrayed the younger version of Oh Mal-soon (Oh Doo-ri/Emily), while Kim Hae-sook played the older version. The cast also included Jung Jin-young and Chae Won-bin. It aired on KBS2 from December 18, 2024, to January 23, 2025.

In 2025, Jung had two film releases. She reunited with Ma Dong-seok in the action-horror film Holy Night: Demon Hunters, appearing in a supporting role as Eun-seo. The film follows a trio of demon hunters who must save Seoul from a devil-worshipping criminal network and was released on April 30, 2025. On June 11, 2025, her film Midnight Sun was released, featuring her as main protagonist Mi-sol. Directed by Jo Young-jun, it adapts the 2006 Japanese film A Song to the Sun, based on Tenkawa Aya's novel. The story centers on Mi-sol, who has a syndrome that forces her to avoid sunlight. She falls for Min-jun (Cha Hak-yeon), a fruit vendor outside her home, eagerly waiting for nightfall to meet him. As they bond over music, they support each other's dreams as singer-songwriters and actors.

== Filmography ==
=== Film ===
Year	Title	Role	Ref.
2014	Daughter	young San	
2015	The Tiger: An Old Hunter's Tale	Seon-yi	
2019	Parasite	Park Da-hye	
2021	The Cursed: Dead Man's Prey	Baek So-Jin	
2022	Men of Plastic	Yoo-ri	
2025	Holy Night: Demon Hunters	Eun-seo	
2025	Midnight Sun	Mi-sol	

=== Television series ===
Year	Title	Role	Note(s)	Ref.
2012	May Queen	young Jang In-hwa		
2012	It Was Love	Choi Sun-jung		
2013	KBS TV Novel: "Samsaengi"	young Seok Sam-saeng		
2013	The Blade and Petal	Cho-hee		
2013	Empress Ki	young Ki Seung-nyang		
2013	KBS Drama Special: "Eun-guk and the Ugly Duckling"	Eun-soo		
2014	My Spring Days	Kang Poo-reum		
2015	Hyde Jekyll, Me	young Jang Ha-na		
2015	Splendid Politics	Eun-seol		
2016	W	young Oh Yeon-joo		
2020	The Cursed	Baek So-jin		
2021	Imitation	Lee Ma-ha		
2021	Doom at Your Service	So Nyeo-sin		
2021	Hellbound	Angel	Special appearance	
2022–2023	The Glory	Moon Dong-eun (young)	Part 1–2	
2022	Curtain Call	Seo Yoon-hee		
2024	Who Is She	Oh Doo-ri		
2025–2026	Pro Bono	Elijah	Cameo (Ep. 7, 8)	

=== Television shows ===
Year	Title	Role	Note(s)	Ref.
2013	Tooniverse's The Unlimited Show Season 4 Reckless Exploration Team	Cast Member	with Kim Dong-hyun, Nancy, Noh Tae-yeop, Shin Dong-woo, Kim Do-hyun, and Park Si-eun	
2022	Hangout with Yoo	Cast Member	with WSG Wannabe	

== Accolades ==
=== Awards and nominations ===
Name of the award ceremony, year presented, category, nominee of the award, and the result of the nomination
Award ceremony	Year	Category	Nominee / Work	Result	Ref.
Alliance of Women Film Journalists EDA Awards	2020	Best Ensemble	Parasite	Nominated	
Austin Film Critics Association Awards	2020	Best Ensemble	Parasite	Nominated	
Baeksang Arts Awards	2020	Best New Actress – Television	The Cursed	Nominated	
Boston Society of Film Critics	2019	Best Ensemble Cast	Parasite	Runner-up (Note: Tied with Once Upon a Time in Hollywood)	
Chlotrudis Awards	2020	Performance by an Ensemble Cast	Parasite	Won	
Critics' Choice Movie Awards	2020	Best Acting Ensemble	Parasite	Nominated	
Detroit Film Critics Society Awards	2019	Best Ensemble	Parasite	Nominated	
Florida Film Critics Circle Awards	2019	Best Ensemble	Parasite	Nominated	
Georgia Film Critics Association Awards	2020	Best Ensemble	Parasite	Nominated	
International Cinephile Society Awards	2020	Best Ensemble	Parasite	Won	
KBS Drama Awards	2013	Best Young Actress	The Blade and Petal, Samsaengi	Nominated	
KBS Drama Awards	2022	Best New Actress	Curtain Call	Won	
KBS Drama Awards	2025	Excellence Award, Actress in a Miniseries	Who Is She	Won	
MBC Drama Awards	2012	Best Young Actress	May Queen	Nominated	
MBC Entertainment Awards	2022	Special Award - Variety Category (Note: with Gaya-G Lee Bo-ram, Soyeon, Hynn and Jung Ji-so)	Hangout with Yoo	Won	
Screen Actors Guild Awards	2020	Outstanding Performance by a Cast in a Motion Picture	Parasite	Won	
Seattle Film Critics Society Awards	2019	Best Ensemble Cast	Parasite	Won	
Washington D.C. Area Film Critics Association Awards	2019	Best Ensemble	Parasite	Nominated	

=== Listicles ===
Name of publisher, year listed, name of listicle, and placement
Publisher	Year	Listicle	Placement	Ref.
Cine21	2021	New Actress to watch out for in 2022	6th (Note: Tied with Park Eun-bin, Moon Ga-young, Keum Sae-rok, Joo Hyun-young, Park Gyu-young, Lee Soo-kyung, Roh Yoon-seo, Gong Seung-yeon, Lee Se-young, IU, Shin Hyun-been, Park Ji-hu, Han So-hee, Go Min-si, Bang Min-ah, Jeon Jong-seo, Roh Jeong-eui)	
Cine21	2023	Top 5 New Actress to watch out for in 2023	5th	
