= Holy Night: Demon Hunters =

2025 film by Lim Da-hee

- Theatrical release poster
- Hangul: 거룩한 밤: 데몬 헌터스
- RR: Georukhan bam: demon heonteoseu
- MR: Kŏrukhan pam: temon hŏnt'ŏsŭ
- Directed by: Lim Dae-hee
- Written by: Lim Dae-hee
- Produced by: Ma Dong-seok
- Starring: Ma Dong-seok; Seohyun; Lee David; Kyung Soo-jin; Jung Ji-so
- Cinematography: Kim Ji-yong
- Edited by: Kim Sun-min
- Music by: Mowg
- Production companies: Big Punch Pictures; Nova Film
- Distributed by: Lotte Entertainment
- Release date: April 30, 2025
- Running time: 92 minutes
- Country: South Korea
- Language: Korean
- Box office: US$6.6 million

Holy Night: Demon Hunters (Korean: 거룩한 밤: 데몬 헌터스) is a 2025 South Korean action horror film directed and written by Lim Dae-hee and stars Ma Dong-seok, Seohyun, Lee David, Kyung Soo-jin and Jung Ji-so. The film revolves around 'Holy Night', a trio of demon hunters armed with supernatural powers, who are called to save Seoul when it descends into chaos as a devil-worshipping criminal network emerges.

It was released in South Korea on April 30, 2025.

== Plot ==
The city is thrown into chaos by the devil and his worshippers of darkness. With law enforcement rendered powerless, those with special abilities step forward. The 'Holy Night' team - Bau, Sharon, and Kim Gun - moves in to eliminate the forces of evil.

They are visited by a woman named Jeong-won, who requests their services for her younger sister, Eun-seo, who is showing strange symptoms, and they sense the energy of a powerful being that is on a completely different level from before. As the true nature of the situation gradually comes to light, the 'Holy Night' team descends deeper into darkness.

== Cast ==
- Ma Dong-seok as Ba Woo
- Seohyun as Sharon
- Lee David as Kim Gun
- Kyung Soo-jin as Jung-won, a neuropsychiatrist
- Jung Ji-so as Eun-seo

== Production ==
Seohyun was offered the lead role in the film in May 2021.

Principal photography began on June 28, 2021 and filming ended on September 12, 2021.

== Release ==
Holy Night: Demon Hunters was released in South Korean theaters on April 30, 2025 by Lotte Entertainment.

A prequel webtoon titled as Holy Night: The Zero to the film, illustrated by Jeong Han-gil, was serialised on Naver Webtoon in October 2024.

Holy Night: Demon Hunters also screened in the "Midnight Fantasy" section of the 27th Shanghai International Film Festival on June 13, 2025. It was also selected at the 29th Fantasia International Film Festival for screening on August 3, 2025.

On November 3, 2025, the film was showcased at the 38th Tokyo International Film Festival in 'Gala Selection' section.

== Reception ==
=== Box office ===
The film was released on April 30, 2025 on 933 screens. It opened at first place at the South Korean box office with 121,321 admissions and a gross of US$680,433.

As of July 5, 2025, the film has grossed US$5,277,180 from 777,649 admissions.
