= Chungshin Girls' High School =

Coordinates: 37.50872°N 127.07190°E

Chungshin Girls' High School 정신여자고등학교

Location
- 16 Olympic-ro 4-gil, Songpa-gu; Seoul; South Korea

Information
- Type: Private
- Established: 1887
- Principal: Lee Hee-cheon (이희천)
- Faculty: 91
- Gender: Girls
- Website: chungshin.sen.hs.kr

Chungshin Girls' High School (Korean: 정신여자고등학교) is a private girls high school located in Jamsil-dong, Songpa District, Seoul, South Korea.

== Notable alumni ==
- Han Myeong-sook, first female Prime Minister of South Korea
- Choi Soo-young, singer and member of girl group Girls' Generation
- Choi Ye-rim, singer, member of girl group Artms and former member of LOONA
- Go Ara, actress
- Hyun Seung-min, actress
- Park So-dam, movie actress
- Kim Yun-mi, speed skater
- Kim Eun-hye, broadcaster and politician
- Son Hye-ju, singer and former member of girl groups LOONA and Loossemble
