= Kiss Sixth Sense =

2022 South Korean series

- Promotional poster
- Hangul: 키스 식스 센스
- RR: Kiseu sikseu senseu
- MR: K'isŭ siksŭ sensŭ
- Genre: Romantic fantasy Romantic comedy
- Created by: Disney+
- Based on: Kiss Sixth Sense by Gatnyeo (갓녀)
- Written by: Jeon Yu-ri
- Directed by: Nam Ki-hoon
- Starring: Yoon Kye-sang; Seo Ji-hye; Kim Ji-seok
- Opening theme: Fantasy by Suran
- Composers: Gaemi; Devin
- Country of origin: South Korea
- Original language: Korean
- No. of episodes: 12

Production
- Executive producer: Han Hye-yeon
- Producers: Kim Eun-ji; Hong Hyun-jae
- Cinematography: Park Jung-hyun; Lee Jin-yong
- Editor: Moon In-dae
- Running time: 60-75 minutes
- Production company: Arc Media

Original release
- Network: Disney+
- Release: May 25 – June 29, 2022

Kiss Sixth Sense (Korean: 키스 식스 센스) is a South Korean television series based on the web novel of the same title. The series released two episodes every Wednesday at 16:00 (KST) from May 25, 2022, to June 29, 2022, exclusively on Disney+ in select regions.

== Plot ==
Hong Ye-sool, a woman who has the supernatural ability to see the future when she is kissed. One day, she accidentally kisses her boss, Cha Min-hoo, and sees their future together. Ye-sool's life gets more entangled when her ex-boyfriend, Lee Pil-yo, comes back into her life.

== Cast ==
=== Main ===
- Yoon Kye-sang as Cha Min-hoo
  - Moon Woo-jin as young Min-hoo
- Seo Ji-hye as Hong Ye-sool
  - Lee Si-ah as young Ye-sool
- Kim Ji-seok as Lee Pil-yo

=== Supporting ===
==== People around Min-hoo ====
- Lee Joo-yeon as Oh Ji-young
- Tae In-ho as Oh Seung-taek, Min-hoo's friend
- Lee Han-wi as Oh Kyung-soo, Min-hoo's doctor

==== People around Ye-sool ====
- Kim Ga-eun as Ban Ho-woo, Ye-sool's cousin
- Um Hyo-sup as Kim Hae-jin
  - Im Ji-kyu as young adult Hae-jin (cameo, Ep. 11-12)
- Kim Hee-jung as Kim Sa-ra, Ye-sool's mother
  - Son Eun-seo as young adult Sa-ra (cameo)

==== People in Zeu Ad ====
- Hwang Bo-ra as Jang Um-ji
- Kim Ki-doo as Kang Sang-goo
- Kim Mi-soo as Kim Min-hee
- Yoon Jung-hoon as Kim Ro-ma
- Kim Jae-hwa as Cho Seon-hee
- Yoo Jung-ho as Yeom Kyung-seok
- Park Sung-geun as Vice President of Zeu Ad
- Lee Yoo-jin as Zeu Ad Planning Team 2 staff
- Ho Sol-hee as Zeu Ad Planning Team 2 staff
- Park Jung-pyo as Zeu Ad set crew chief

==== People around Pil-yo ====
- Jung Ra-el as PD Yoo
- Kim Min-joong as Kim Yoon-soo, Pil-yo's assistant director
- Kim Ye-ji as Pil-yo's staff

=== Others ===
- Yoo Seung-mok as Mopix Advertising Director
- Moon Hak-jin as Daehan University Hospital resident
- Lee Seung-hee as Kim Joon-ho, Daehan University Hospital resident
- Kim Chang-hwan as Ji-young's manager
- Ahn Je-na as Ji-young's staff
- Kim Ki-nam as Detective Yang
- Lee Jong-goo as Noel Orphanage director
- Jeon Jin-ki as Billy Bed director (Ep. 1-2)
- Jung Tae-ya as Billy Bed executive (Ep. 1-3)
- Jung Sae-rom as Billy Bed executive (Ep. 1-2)
- Yoon Jong-won as Piaget president (Ep. 3)
- Lee Soo-hyung as Mopix employee (Ep. 4)
- Kim Jin-ok as Ye-sool's neighbor 1 (Ep. 5)
- Han Ji-eun as Ye-sool's neighbor 2 (Ep. 5)
- Kim Shi-ah as Eun-jung's child (Ep. 5, 8)
- Lee Moon-nyung as CCTV installer (Ep. 6)
- Lee Jae-woo as Zeu Ad location manager (Ep. 6)
- Kim Chae-hyun as bridal store manager (Ep. 7)
- Jeong Jung-ah as Sang-goo's wife (Ep. 8)
- Lee Ji-young as Eun-jung's husband (Ep. 8)
- Kim Ga-eul as Kang Ka-eul, Sang-goo's daughter (Ep. 8)
- Han Ra-on as Kang Ra-on, Sang-goo's son (Ep. 8)
- Kwon Hye-ryung as Daehan University Hospital intern (Ep. 9)
- Song Jin-hee as reporter (Ep. 9)
- Jin Sung-min as detective (Ep. 9)

=== Special appearances ===
- Lee Dong-gun as Hong Sung-joon, Ye-sool's father (Ep. 1, 10-12)
- Kim Jung-gi as Zeu Ad editing engineer (Ep. 1)
- Yeo Hoe-hyun as cafe employee (Ep. 1)
- Han Dong-ho as Ye-sool's ex-boyfriend #1 (Ep. 1)
- Jung Gun-joo as Ye-sool's ex-boyfriend #2 (Ep. 1)
- Lee Seung-chul as homeless man (Ep. 2)
- Park Byung-eun as fishing couple husband (Ep. 3)
- Jeon Hye-bin as fishing couple wife (Ep. 3)
- Lee Jae-wook as The male lead in the movie 'Haru' (Ep. 3, 5, 9)
- Kim Sae-ron as The female lead in the movie 'Haru' (Ep. 3, 5, 9)
- Lee Mi-do as Lisa (Ep. 4)
- Baek Seung-hee as Eun-jung, Pil-yo's senior colleague (Ep. 5, 8)
- Kim Kwang-sik as Chul-yong, Sa-ra's boyfriend (Ep. 10-12)
- Song Hoon as Ko Sang-kyu, Kyung-seok's college classmate (Ep. 11)
- Ko Jun as Ji-young's co-star (Ep. 11)
- Ra.L as singer (Ep. 11)
- Kim Sang-ho as director (Ep. 12)

== Production ==
=== Casting ===
The casting line-up of Kiss Sixth Sense was announced from August to September 2021. Yoon Kye-sang and Seo Ji-hye reunited in the series after starring together as siblings in the 2004 SBS drama My 19 Year Old Sister-in-Law. On April 21, 2022, photos from the official script reading were published.

=== Filming ===
On January 5, 2022, the series canceled the scheduled filming for the day due to the sudden death of Kim Mi-soo. The filming resumed the following day after it was paused, but there was no confirmation on whether her character would be recast, or scenes were completed.

== Release ==
Apart from South Korea, other Disney+ Star markets with Kiss Sixth Sense scheduled for May 25, 2022, included Singapore, Hong Kong, and Taiwan. The series aired on the same date for Malaysia, Indonesia, and Thailand via Disney+ Hotstar. It was scheduled for June 29, 2022, in Japan.

== Original soundtrack ==
Kiss Sixth Sense (Original Television Soundtrack)

Soundtrack album by various artists
- Released: July 2, 2022
- Recorded: 2022
- Genres: Soundtrack; Ballad; K-pop
- Length: 106:06
- Languages: Korean; English
- Label: Disney+/Arc Media/Hi-Hat/Most Contents

Singles from Kiss Sixth Sense
- 1. "My Americano" Released: May 25, 2022; 2. "Even If I Can't Have You" Released: June 1, 2022; 3. "Kiss Sixth Sense" Released: June 5, 2022; 4. "Fantasy" Released: June 8, 2022; 5. "You Make Me" Released: June 11, 2022; 6. "Stay With Me" Released: June 15, 2022; 7. "Give You Everything" Released: June 22, 2022; 8. "Here We Are" Released: June 26, 2022; 9. "No Matter How Hard I Try" Released: June 29, 2022

The following is the official tracklist of Kiss Sixth Sense (Original Television Soundtrack) album. The tracks with no indicated lyricists and composers are the drama's musical score; the artists indicated for these tracks are the tracks' composers themselves. Singles included on the album were released from May 25, 2022, to June 29, 2022.

CD 1
No.	Title	Lyrics	Music	Artist	Length
1.	"My Americano" (아메리카노 같아 넌)	Ra.L; Naomi	Ra.L	Yuju	3:21
2.	"Even If I Can't Have You" (가질 수 없어도)	Lee Joon-hwa	Lee Joon-hwa	Zia	4:54
3.	"Kiss Sixth Sense"	Lee Joon-hwa	Lee Joon-hwa	Lee Joon-hwa	2:51
4.	"Fantasy"	Ra.L	Gaemi; XKA; Shoon	Suran	3:20
5.	"You Make Me"	Hena; Joon-wha Lee	Gaemi; Joon-wha Lee	Woong San	3:40
6.	"Stay With Me"	Ga-deul	Gaemi; Midnight; TM	Grizzly	3:23
7.	"Give You Everything"	Lee Joon-hwa	Gaemi; Glody; Kim Se-mi; Abe Song	Na Yoon-kwon	4:23
8.	"Here We Are"	Tetri Song	Tetri Song	Jae-yeon (Sway)	4:11
9.	"No Matter How Hard I Try" (그게 잘 안돼)	CALi (Vendors); De View; Se.A; Jung Jae-yeon	Vendors (Note: Performed by Vendors members CALi, ZENUR and Fascinador.); YEZI; Se.A; De View	Kim Do-hee	3:26
Total length:					32:24

CD 2
No.	Title	Artist	Length
1.	"Let's Go" (그래 가보자)	Gaemi; Joon-wha Lee	3:06
2.	"Dumb Dumb"	Lee Joon-hwa	2:13
3.	"Not Bad"	Devin	2:33
4.	"Scent"	Yoo Min-ho	2:47
5.	"Ye-sool Theme"	Lee Sung-goo	2:43
6.	"What Should I Do?" (어쩌지)	Park Mi-sun	1:49
7.	"nth Attempting" (n번차 시도 중)	Park Yoon-seo	1:51
8.	"Calm Down" (침착하자)	Park Mi-sun	2:03
9.	"Oboe Comic"	Lee Sung-goo	0:47
10.	"This Ain't It" (이게 아닌데)	Joon-wha Lee	1:50
11.	"Sir Cha"	Yoo Min-ho	1:05
12.	"The Day of Consolation" (위로가 필요한 날)	Park Yoon-seo	2:51
13.	"My Own Senses"	Park Jung-hwan	2:19
14.	"Yesool's Diary" (예술의 일기)	Gaemi	2:35
15.	"Future Woman" (미래를 보는 여자)	Park Yoon-seo	3:23
16.	"Last Chance"	Devin	3:19
17.	"Senses the Presence"	Park Jung-hwan	2:23
18.	"So Cute!" (귀여워! 귀여워!)	Park Mi-sun	1:45
19.	"It's Me, Ghost" (나야 고스트)	Gaemi; Park Jung-hwan	2:32
20.	"Right Now"	Joon-wha Lee	1:53
21.	"Here We Go"	Yoo Min-ho	1:27
22.	"It's Alright"	Devin	2:17
23.	"Mysterious"	Lee Sung-goo	2:55
24.	"It's a Mess" (난리부르스)	Park Yoon-seo	1:12
25.	"Ddinga Ddinga" (띵가띵가)	Gaemi; Joon-wha Lee	2:35
26.	"I'm Screwed" (망했어 망했다구)	Park Mi-sun	1:30
27.	"Familiar"	Lee Sung-goo	1:14
28.	"Halcyon"	Yoo Min-ho	2:50
29.	"Sorry, Already Know" (미안해 이미 다 알고 있었나 봐)	Joon-wha Lee	3:12
30.	"The Sense of Loss"	Park Jung-hwan	2:26
31.	"The Break Up"	Devin	3:35
32.	"It's Me, Ghost 2" (나야 고스트 2)	Gaemi; Park Jung-hwan	2:56
Total length:			73:42

== Reception ==
Following its release, Kiss Sixth Sense repeatedly ranked within the top five among the "Top 10 TV Shows on Disney+" in South Korea, having ranked first place on June 7. It also steadily ranked within the top 10 on this same list in Hong Kong, Singapore, and Taiwan while ranking in the top three of this list in Indonesia.
