= Kim Mi-soo =

South Korean actress (1992–2022)

- Portrait of Kim
- Born: March 16, 1992; South Korea
- Died: January 5, 2022 (aged 29)
- Education: Korea National University of Arts – Acting
- Occupations: Actress; model
- Years active: 2018–2022
- Agent: Landscape Entertainment

Korean name
- Hangul: 김미수
- RR: Gim Misu
- MR: Kim Misu

Kim Mi-soo (March 16, 1992 – January 5, 2022) was a South Korean actress and model.

== Career ==
Kim began her debut in 2018 in Lipstick Revolution. During the early stages of her career, Kim was known for her debut role from Lipstick Revolution and a supporting character from Kyungmi's World. She also appeared in the 2020 drama Hi Bye, Mama! as the female protagonist's sister.

Kim recently gained attention for her portrayal of a cold but kind and righteous student activist Yeo Jeong-min in JTBC's Snowdrop (2021–22). Despite the show's controversies relating to alleged historical distortion, Kim's appearance in Snowdrop was her most notable on-screen performance to date; however, it became her second-last on-screen role as Kim died on 5 January 2022. Prior to Kim's death, seven out of 16 episodes had been broadcast, and the filming had concluded since Snowdrop was a pre-produced series.

Kim was cast in an undisclosed role in Disney+'s original drama Kiss Sixth Sense, which was set to air in the first half of 2022, and it has started filming. Kiss Six Sense canceled the scheduled filming for the day due to the sudden death of Kim Mi-soo. The filming resumed the following day after they paused filming, but there was no confirmation on whether Kim's character would be recast, or Kim's scenes were completed; Kim's character was as an assistant manager for the advertising firm portrayed on the series.

== Death ==
On January 5, 2022, Kim died due to unspecified causes at age 29. Her funeral was held privately in Seoul two days after she died. Kim's fans and her fellow cast members from Snowdrop, including Jung Hae-in and Black Pink's Jisoo paid tributes to her on social media. Her cause of death has not been made public, and her agency stated in a press release, "We sincerely ask you to refrain from making up rumors or speculative reports so that the bereaved family, who are in shock and grief-stricken, can reverently commemorate the deceased."

== Filmography ==
=== Film ===
Year	Title	Role	Ref.
2018	Lipstick Revolution	Jo-yeon	
2019	Memories	Seon-ah	
2019	Kyungmi's World	Jung-so	
2021	The Cursed: Dead Man's Prey	Reporter	

=== Television series ===
Year	Title	Role	Notes	Ref.
2019	Drama Festa	Jung Ji-hyun	Episodes: "Human Luwak"	
2020	Hi Bye, Mama!	Cha Yun-ji		
2020	Into the Ring	Kwon Woo-young		
2020	Drama Special	Jo Joo-young	Episode: "One Night"	
2021	Yumi's Cells	Ja-young	Ba-bi's ex girlfriend	
2021–2022	Snowdrop	Yeo Jeong-min		

=== Web series ===
Year	Title	Role	Ref.
2020	The School Nurse Files	Hwang Ga-young	
2021	Hellbound	Deacon Young-in	
2022	Kiss Sixth Sense	Kim Min-hee	
