= Marin Ceaușu =

Romanian general

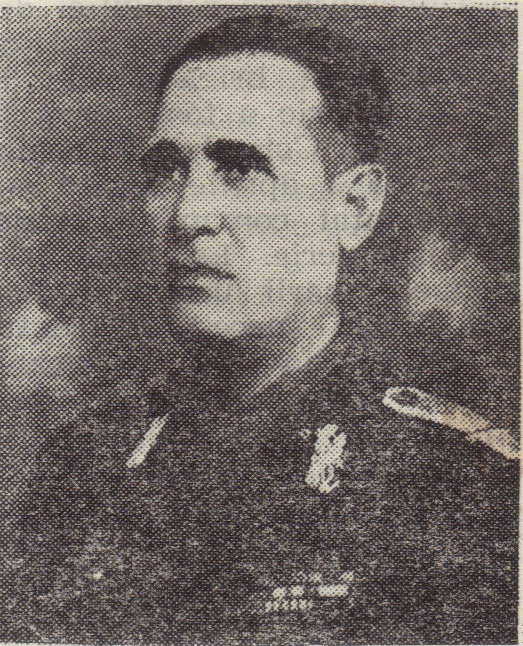
Marin Ceaușu

Marin Ceaușu (15 August 1891–21 August 1954) was a Romanian brigadier-general during World War II.

== Biography ==
He was born in Bârca, Dolj County. After graduating in 1913 from military school with the rank of second lieutenant, he commanded a platoon with the 5th Artillery Regiment until 1916, when he was promoted to lieutenant. He served in World War I with the 1st Artillery Regiment and was made captain in 1917. During the Romanian Campaign of 1916–1917 he fought in battles at Muncelu, Târgu Ocna, and Cireșoaia.

During the interwar, he advanced in rank to major (1923), lieutenant colonel (1933), and colonel (1938).

From 1939 to 1942 Ceaușu served as Commanding Officer 14th Artillery Regiment. In 1942 he became Commanding Officer 2nd Infantry Division and fought at the Second Battle of Kharkov. In September 1942, during the offensive towards Stalingrad, he was wounded by a mine explosion, and was put at disposition for I Corps. In 1943, he was promoted to brigadier general, and was named General Officer Commanding Artillery IV Corps. In 1944, he was General Officer Commanding Artillery V Corps and fought in Moldavia. Finally, in 1945, he served in Czechoslovakia as General Officer Commanding 21st Division, during the Prague offensive.

Ceaușu went into reserve in 1946, and retired in 1947. He died in Bucharest in 1954.

== Awards ==
- Order of the Star of Romania, Officer class, 8 June 1940.
- Order of the Star of Romania, Commander class.
- Order of Michael the Brave, 3rd class, 4 August 1945.
- Iron Cross, 2nd class and 1st class.
