= The Cursed: Dead Man's Prey =

2021 South Korean occult thriller film

- Official teaser poster
- Hangul: 방법: 재차의
- RR: Bangbeop: jaechaui
- MR: Pangbŏp: chaech'aŭi
- Directed by: Kim Yong-wan
- Written by: Yeon Sang-ho
- Starring: Uhm Ji-won; Jung Ji-so; Jung Moon-sung; Oh Yoon-ah
- Cinematography: Lee Ji-hoon
- Edited by: Lee Yeon Jung
- Music by: Kim Dong-uk
- Production companies: Climax Studio (formerly known as Lezhin Studio); KeyEast; CJ ENM; Studio Dragon
- Distributed by: CJ ENM
- Release date: July 28, 2021
- Running time: 109 minutes
- Country: South Korea
- Language: Korean
- Box office: est. US$1.31 million

The Cursed: Dead Man's Prey (Korean: 방법: 재차의; RR: Bangbeop: jaechaui; lit. 'Method: re') is a 2021 South Korean occult thriller film, directed by Kim Yong-wan and starring Uhm Ji-won, Jung Ji-so and Oh Yoon-ah. The film written by Yeon Sang-ho is a sequel of the 2020 drama The Cursed. It tells the story of a reporter who pursues the truth of a murder case in which the culprit turns out to be a revived corpse. It was released in theatres on July 28, 2021. It marked the final film appearance of Kim Mi-soo before her death in January 2022.

== Cast ==
- Uhm Ji-won as Im Jin-hee, a reporter and author in independent news channel Urban Detective
- Jung Ji-so as Baek So-jin, a methodist
- Jung Moon-sung as Jeong Seong-jun Detective
- Oh Yoon-ah as Byun Mi-Yeong, executive director
- Ko Kyu-pil as Tak Jeong-Hoon, Professor
- Kim In-kwon as Kim Pil-sung
- Jeon Gook-Hwan as Byun Seung-Il
- Kwon Hae-hyo as Lee Sang-In
- Jung Jae-Sung as Kim Min-Seop
- Yeon Woo-jin as Kang Young-soo, Detective
- Nam Yeon-Woo as Yoo Jung-Hoon, Detective
- Lee Seol as Jessy, an independent news channel Urban Detective
- Kim Mi-soo as Female Reporter
- Jo Han-chul as Park Yong-Ho
- Park Jong-Hwan as Min Hyun-Chung, a criminal
- Jang Young-Yoo as Male Reporter
- Shim So-young as Cleaner
- Park Chan-woo as Park Woo-Chan
- Kim Hee-Chang as Chief Investigator
- Lee Joong-ok as Chun Joo-bong

== Production ==
On July 16, 2020, it was reported that the drama The Cursed will be adapted into a film with the same cast of Uhm Ji-won and Jung Ji-so. The film to be directed by Kim Yong-wan and written by Yeon Sang-ho will be produced by Climax Studios on the planning of Studio Dragon. Oh Yoon-ah, and Lee Seol were to join the cast.

The filming began on September 9, 2020, and was wrapped up on December 5.

== Release ==
The film was released on July 28, 2021, on 838 screens. It was also selected in 'Korean Cinema Today - Panorama Section' at the 26th Busan International Film Festival and was screened on October 8, 2021.

The film was invited to the 40th Brussels International Fantastic Film Festival and was screened for Belgian premiere on August 30, 2022.

== Reception ==
=== Box office ===
According to the integrated computer network for movie theater admissions by the Korea Film Council (KoFiC), the film was in 4th place at the Korean box office by collecting 28,544 audiences on the opening day of its release.

According to Korean Film Council (Kofic) data, it is in 13th place among all the Korean films released in the year 2021, with a gross of US$1.31 million and 175,578 admissions, as of December 12, 2021.

=== Critical response ===
Kim Seong-hoon of Cine21 wrote that the film based on the 2020 drama The Cursed retains the settings of drama but that the narrative is built on action instead of suspense. Kim opined that scenes of pursuit by resurrected corpses and killing were striking. Kim concluded the review, by writing, "The second half of the film, which reveals the story of redemption, is sharp enough to reveal the bare face of Korean society."

Son Jeong-bin of Newsis felt that the action in the film is pleasing to the eyes. Son wrote that fantasy settings were attractive, but the story was weak. Son opined that the film being a sequel to the drama The Cursed, could be a deterrent for the audience. Concluding Son wrote, "of course, it is true that the film can be enjoyed without prior knowledge of the drama 'How', but it is also appropriate to point out that the connection between the two works does not give the main character an opportunity to easily immerse himself in it".

== Home media ==
The film became available for streaming on video-on-demand services from IPTV and digital cable TV on August 12, 2021.
