= Lipovu =

- Commune
- Location in Romania
- Coordinates: 44°6′N 23°38′E
- Country: Romania
- County: Dolj
- Area: 40.76 km^{2} (15.74 sq mi)
- Population (2021-12-01): 3,208
  - Density: 78.70/km^{2} (203.8/sq mi)
- Time zone: UTC+02:00 (EET)
  - Summer (DST): UTC+03:00 (EEST)
- Vehicle reg.: DJ

Lipovu is a commune in Dolj County, Oltenia, Romania, with a population of 3,189 people. It is composed of two villages, Lipovu and Lipovu de Sus.
