= Daegu Physical Education High School =

Location
- Daegu, Gyeongsangbuk-do; South Korea
- Coordinates: 35°50′23.6″N 129°17′9″E

Information
- School type: Special-education school
- Motto: Standing on the top
- Opened: March 5, 2003
- Website: www.daegu-ph.hs.kr/site/daeguph/index.html

Daegu Physical Education High School (Korean: 대구체육고등학교; Hanja: 大邱體育高等學校) is special-education school in Daegu, South Korea. The school's centered education summed up four ones. First, a person being respected by right manner and correct actions. Second, a creative person investigating education ability. Third, the person that basic physical strength and a special match function are excellent. Fourth, a person developing career so as to meet talent, aptitude. The motto is "standing on the top".

== History ==
The plan for establishing the school was approved on 20 May 1999, and the establishment process was completed on 15 December 2000. The first entrance ceremony was held on 5 March 2003.
