= Victorina Bora =

Romanian handball player (born 1972)

Personal information
- Nationality: Romanian
- Born: 15 January 1972 (age 53) Urzicuța, Romania

Sport
- Sport: Handball
- Position: Line player

Victorina Bora (born 15 January 1972) is a Romanian handball player. She competed in the women's tournament at the 2000 Summer Olympics.
