= Lee Seol (YouTuber) =

South Korean online streamer and youtuber (born 1992)

- Born: February 7, 1992 (age 34); South Korea
- Occupations: YouTuber; streamer

YouTube information
- Channel: 이설 Leeseol
- Years active: 2012–active (streamer)
- Subscribers: 460 thousand

Korean name
- Hangul: 이설
- RR: I Seol
- MR: I Sŏl
- Last updated: February 2021

Lee Seol (Korean: 이설, born February 7, 1992) is a South Korean online streamer and YouTuber.

== Biography and career ==
When Lee Seol's parents divorced in childhood, Lee Seol's mother raised Lee Seol and his brother and sister, who reportedly delivered newspapers during the day and worked at restaurants at night. However, Lee Seol's mother underwent back surgery when Lee Seol became a junior high school student and her brother suffered from liver disease, and Lee Seol played the role of the girl for five years from high school to pay for her mother and brother's hospital bills and living expenses.

Lee Seol worked part-time after high school at 3 p.m. and worked another part-time job from night to 6 a.m. However, since she was a minor who could not work part-time at night, she borrowed a copy of her acquaintance's sister and got a job. Lee Seol suffered from sleep deprivation when she was in high school, so she often slept in the school bathroom, had a nosebleed, or collapsed due to anemia. After leaving a two-room semi-basement house in Eunpyeong-gu, Seoul when she was a high school student, Lee Seol lived alone near Dongdaemun and paid off his family's debts when she was 20.

Lee Seol debuted as an Afreeca TV BJ in 2012 and also appeared on YouTube. The stage name Lee Seol is said to be derived from his dog, 'Jakseol'. Major broadcasting content is female cam, eating show, dance cam, and game broadcasting, and game broadcasts are mainly focused on League of Legends, Overwatch, Sudden Attack, and Battleground. She also made headlines for her appearance and sensual body resembling singer Choa, who was a member of the girl group AOA. In 2015 and 2016, she won the Afreeca TV BJ Grand Prize THE 20, and in 2015 and 2018, Lee Seol's character who took the image of Lee Seol, was released at Nexon's Sudden Attack.

== Incident ==
On July 6, 2019, allegations were raised in the Internet community that Lee Seol had an affair with her ex-boyfriend, Yoo Eun and Lee Chae-yi, who served as Afreeca TV BJs. Yoo-eun explained through a live broadcast on Afreeca TV that the allegations were true, and Lee Seol said during a phone call with Yoo-eun, "Just because I kill myself doesn't mean I feel better. I'm not threatening you, but the article will be out tomorrow morning.". Lee Seol sued Yoo Eun on July 11, 2019 for defamation by false facts, and Yoo Eun responded by appointing a lawyer. However, Yu-eun explained in a live broadcast on Afreeca TV on 7 November 2019 that she was cleared of charges due to insufficient evidence and dropped the charges against Lee. After issuing an apology, Lee Seol stopped broadcasting on the Internet for a while before returning to Afreeca TV on 11 September 2020. However, Yoo Eun complained about Lee Seol's return to the Internet broadcast on live television in Afreeca TV.

== Awards and Proceedings of the awards ceremonies ==
=== Awards ===
- 2015 Afreeca TV BJ Award for THE 20
- 2016 Afreeca TV BJ Award for THE 20

=== Proceedings of the awards ceremonies ===
- 2016 Afreeca TV BJ Awards Ceremony Part 1 (Hosted with Roizo)
- 2017 Afreeca TV BJ Awards Ceremony Part 1 (Hosted with Ginyuda)
