= Întorsura =

- Commune
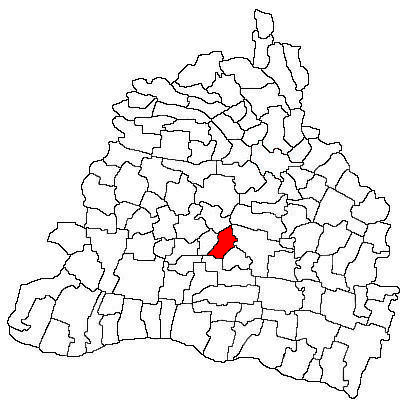
- Location in Dolj County

- Location in Romania
- Coordinates: 44°7′N 23°35′E
- Country: Romania
- County: Dolj
- Area: 31.33 km^{2} (12.10 sq mi)
- Population (2021-12-01): 1,291
  - Density: 41.21/km^{2} (106.7/sq mi)
- Time zone: UTC+02:00 (EET)
  - Summer (DST): UTC+03:00 (EEST)
- Vehicle reg.: DJ

Întorsura is a commune in Dolj County, Oltenia, Romania with a population of 1,280 people. It is composed of a single village, Întorsura, part of Radovan Commune until 2004, when it was split off.
