= Radovan, Dolj =

Commune in Romania

Radovan
- Commune
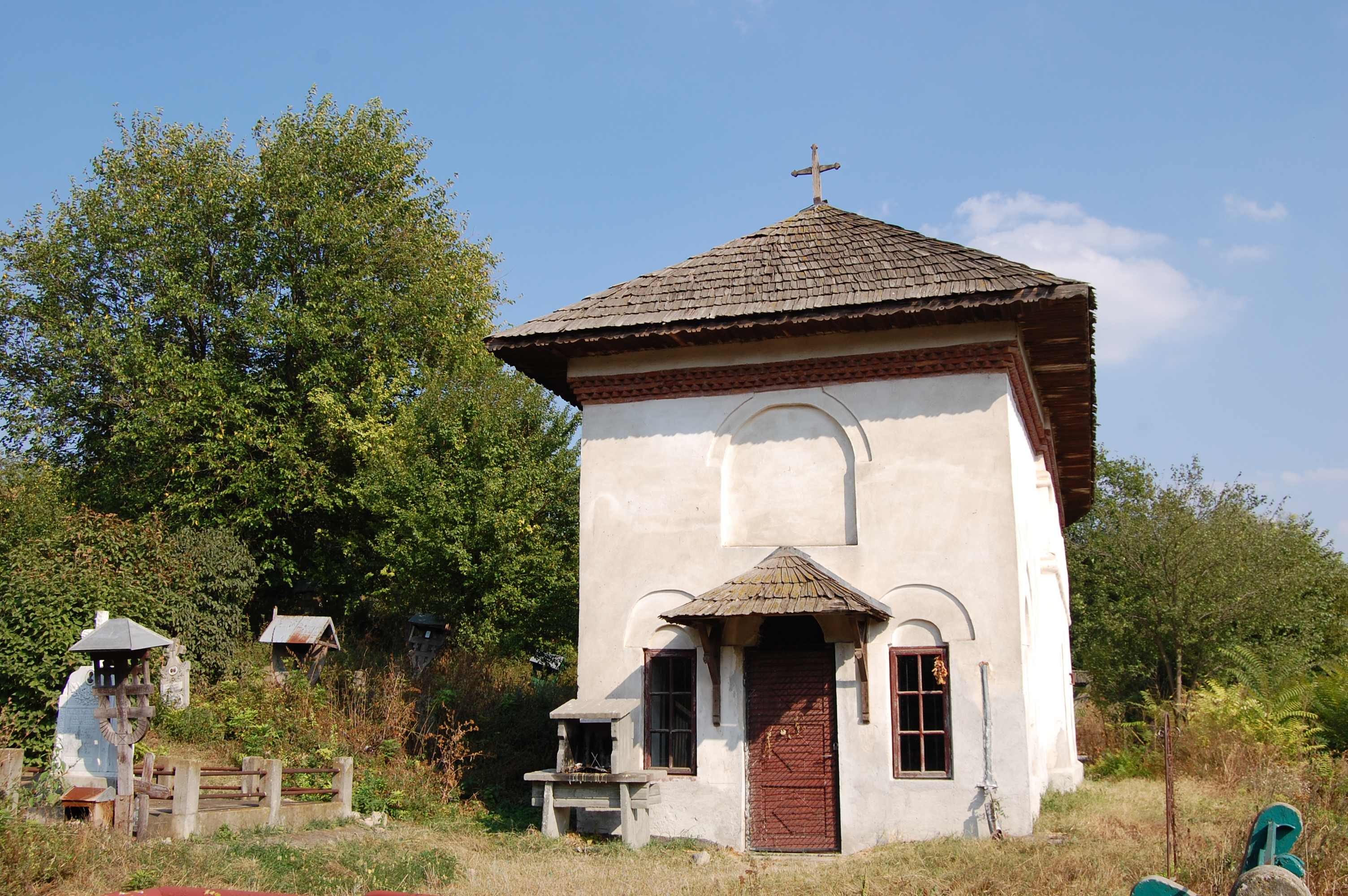

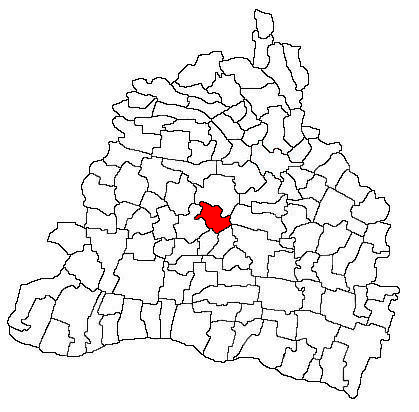
- Location in Dolj County

- Location in Romania
- Coordinates: 44°10′N 23°37′E
- Country: Romania
- County: Dolj
- Area: 53.48 km^{2} (20.65 sq mi)
- Population (2021-12-01): 1,150
  - Density: 21.5/km^{2} (55.7/sq mi)
- Time zone: UTC+02:00 (EET)
  - Summer (DST): UTC+03:00 (EEST)
- Vehicle reg.: DJ

Radovan is a commune in Dolj County, Oltenia, Romania with a population of 1,150 people. It is composed of three villages: Fântânele, Radovan and Târnava. It also included the village of Întorsura until 2004, when it was split off to form a separate commune.
