= Bârca =

- Commune
- Location in Romania
- Coordinates: 43.970°N 23.618°E
- Country: Romania
- County: Dolj

Government
  - Mayor (2024–2028): Cristinel Urtilă (PSD)
- Area: 88.97 km^{2} (34.35 sq mi)
- Elevation: 51 m (167 ft)
- Population (2021-12-01): 3,720
  - Density: 42/km^{2} (110/sq mi)
- Time zone: EET/EEST (UTC+2/+3)
- Postal code: 207055
- Area code: +(40) 251
- Vehicle reg.: DJ
- Website: primariacomuneibirca.ro

Bârca is a commune in Dolj County, Oltenia, Romania with a population of 3,720 people as of 2021. It is composed of a single village, Bârca.

== Natives ==
- Marin Ceaușu (1891–1954), brigadier-general during World War II
