= Lee Seol (actress, born 1989) =

South Korean actress (born 1989)

- Born: January 23, 1989 (age 37); South Korea
- Education: Haengshin High School
- Occupation: Actress
- Years active: 2006–present

Korean name
- Hangul: 이민지
- RR: I Minji
- MR: I Minji

Stage name
- Hangul: 이설
- RR: I Seol
- MR: I Sŏl

Lee Seol (Korean: 이설, born Lee Min-ji (이민지), January 23, 1989) is a South Korean actress.

== Career ==
She wanted to be an entertainer since childhood and participated in SM Entertainment's singer audition when she was in the sixth grade of elementary school. After entering middle school, she decided to become an actor and participated in more than 100 auditions when she was in middle and high school. She made her acting debut in the 16-episode youth sex education television drama Sex Education Dotcom, which aired on Mnet from March to June 2006, and appeared on the satellite DMB radio program Super Junior Yesung's Miracle for You on TU Media in 2006. She graduated from Haengshin High School in February 2007 and majored in media and directing through the Academic Credit Bank System.

She has appeared in several films while working as a female musical and theater actress and founded Fantastic Musical Wedding, an agency specializing in wedding celebrations with current musical actors.

In April 2007, she made a UCC video clip of 'Korea Anthem Girl' (애국가녀) that conveys messages while singing South Korean National Anthem in English, Japanese, Chinese and French, and said she produced a UCC video to promote Korea to the world. She has appeared in several musical and theatrical works while acting as an actress and established Fantastic Musical Wedding (판타스틱 뮤지컬 웨딩), a performance agency specializing in wedding celebrations with current musical actors. She also posted a collection of wedding song recommendations and a video clip of wedding songs incorporating musical styles on his YouTube channel "Singing Minjee" (노래하는이민지). In 2019, she directed and directed the independent film Blue Day (블루데이), which was produced through tumblbug's crowdfunding project, while also appearing in the film herself as Minji, an office worker. The film is based on a change of heart caused by the death of Minji's friend and unknown theater actress, Suhye.

== Filmography ==
=== Television ===
Year	Title	Network	Role
2006	Sex Education Dotcom	Mnet	Minji
2006	Sharp 3	KBS	
2011	Deep Rooted Tree	SBS	

=== Films ===
Year	Title	Role	Notes
2006	Dasepo Naughty Girls		
2019	Blue Day	Office worker Minji	Director

=== Musicals ===
Year	Title	Role
2011	Nunsense 2 (넌센스 2)	Mary Leo
2012	Throw the peak (피크를 던져라)	Zia
2014	Superman with the moon (달을 품은 슈퍼맨)	Sunny
2014	Dorothy Band (도로시밴드)	Dorothy
2015	That man, that woman (그남자 그여자)	Jiwon
2015	30 days before the end of the world (지구멸망 30일 전)	Oh Hye-won
2016	Youth Band Zero (청춘밴드 제로)	Cho Mi-ryo
2017	Seven Days (세븐데이즈)	Narrator
2017	Adult brother (어른동생)	Haru
2017	Five Drawings About Love (사랑에 대한 다섯개의 소묘)	Junior female college student, Wife on wife's birthday, Old maid
2018	Vaguely over the window (창문너머 어렴풋이)	Jeong-hwa
2018	Eolssu (얼쑤)	Rubber shoes - Nam-i
2019	Rapunzel (라푼젤)	Rapunzel
2019	Eolssu (얼쑤)	Jeom-soon
2020	Eolssu (얼쑤)	Rubber shoes - Nam-i

=== Plays ===
Year	Title	Role
2011	Forbidden Pranks - Terrible Love (금지된 장난 - 지독한 사랑)	Minji
2011	Paramour (정인)	Paramour
2012	Young bride	Min Ju-hwa
2016	Moonlight croquis (달빛 크로키)	Rooftop Croquis Yuri
2020	One more time (한번 더 해요)	Yoo Seon-young

=== Music video appearances ===
Year	Singer	Song title
2005	Drunken Tiger	"All marginalized, one step forward with your left foot" (소외된 모두, 왼발을 한 보 앞으로)
2009	Ji Hyun-woo (The Nuts)	"She's sick" (그녀가 아파요)
2014	Snowfinger	"The song that goes to you" (너에게 가는 노래)
