= Bistreț =

- Commune
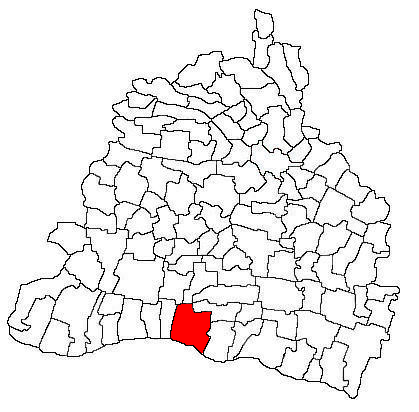
- Location in Dolj County

- Location in Romania
- Coordinates: 43°54′N 23°30′E
- Country: Romania
- County: Dolj

Government
  - Mayor (2024–2028): Cristiana Antonie (PSD)
- Area: 122.4 km^{2} (47.3 sq mi)
- Elevation: 31 m (102 ft)
- Population (2021-12-01): 4,211
  - Density: 34.40/km^{2} (89.10/sq mi)
- Time zone: UTC+02:00 (EET)
  - Summer (DST): UTC+03:00 (EEST)
- Postal code: 207065
- Area code: +(40) 251
- Vehicle reg.: DJ
- Website: www.primariabistret.ro

Bistreț is a commune in Dolj County, Oltenia, Romania with a population of 4,211 as of the 2021 census. It is composed of four villages: Bistreț, Bistrețu Nou, Brândușa, and Plosca.

The commune has an area of 80.16 km^{2} (30.95 sq mi). It is located at the southern limit of Dolj County, on the left bank of the Danube, which forms the border with Bulgaria.

== Natives ==
- Ilie Balaci (1956–2018), football player and manager
