= Cerăt =

- Commune
- Location in Romania
- Coordinates: 44°4′N 23°40′E
- Country: Romania
- County: Dolj
- Area: 45 km^{2} (17 sq mi)
- Population (2021-12-01): 4,191
  - Density: 93/km^{2} (240/sq mi)
- Time zone: UTC+02:00 (EET)
  - Summer (DST): UTC+03:00 (EEST)
- Vehicle reg.: DJ

Cerăt is a commune in Dolj County, Oltenia, Romania with a population of 4,077 people. It is composed of two villages, Cerăt and Malaica.
