= Vârvoru de Jos =

- Commune
- Location in Romania
- Coordinates: 44°13′N 23°37′E
- Country: Romania
- County: Dolj
- Area: 51.45 km^{2} (19.86 sq mi)
- Population (2021-12-01): 2,641
  - Density: 51.33/km^{2} (132.9/sq mi)
- Time zone: UTC+02:00 (EET)
  - Summer (DST): UTC+03:00 (EEST)
- Vehicle reg.: DJ

Vârvoru de Jos is a commune in Dolj County, Oltenia, Romania with a population of 3,408 people. It is composed of eight villages: Bujor, Ciutura, Criva, Dobromira, Drăgoaia, Gabru, Vârvor and Vârvoru de Jos.
