= Giurgița =

- Commune
- Location in Romania
- Coordinates: 44°1′N 23°38′E
- Country: Romania
- County: Dolj
- Area: 73.5 km^{2} (28.4 sq mi)
- Population (2021-12-01): 2,730
  - Density: 37.1/km^{2} (96.2/sq mi)
- Time zone: UTC+02:00 (EET)
  - Summer (DST): UTC+03:00 (EEST)
- Vehicle reg.: DJ

Giurgița is a commune in Dolj County, Oltenia, Romania. It is composed of three villages: Curmătura, Filaret and Giurgița.
