= Vela, Dolj =

Vela
- Commune
- Location in Romania
- Coordinates: 44°17′N 23°25′E
- Country: Romania
- County: Dolj
- Area: 66.19 km^{2} (25.56 sq mi)
- Population (2021-12-01): 1,639
  - Density: 24.76/km^{2} (64.13/sq mi)
- Time zone: UTC+02:00 (EET)
  - Summer (DST): UTC+03:00 (EEST)
- Vehicle reg.: DJ

Vela is a commune in Dolj County, Oltenia, Romania with a population of 1,639 people. It is composed of eight villages: Bucovicior, Cetățuia, Desnățui, Gubaucea, Segleț, Suharu, Știubei, Vela.
