= November 1916 =

Month in 1916

<<	November 1916					>>
Su	Mo	Tu	We	Th	Fr	Sa
			1	2	3	4
5	6	7	8	9	10	11
12	13	14	15	16	17	18
19	20	21	22	23	24	25
26	27	28	29	30

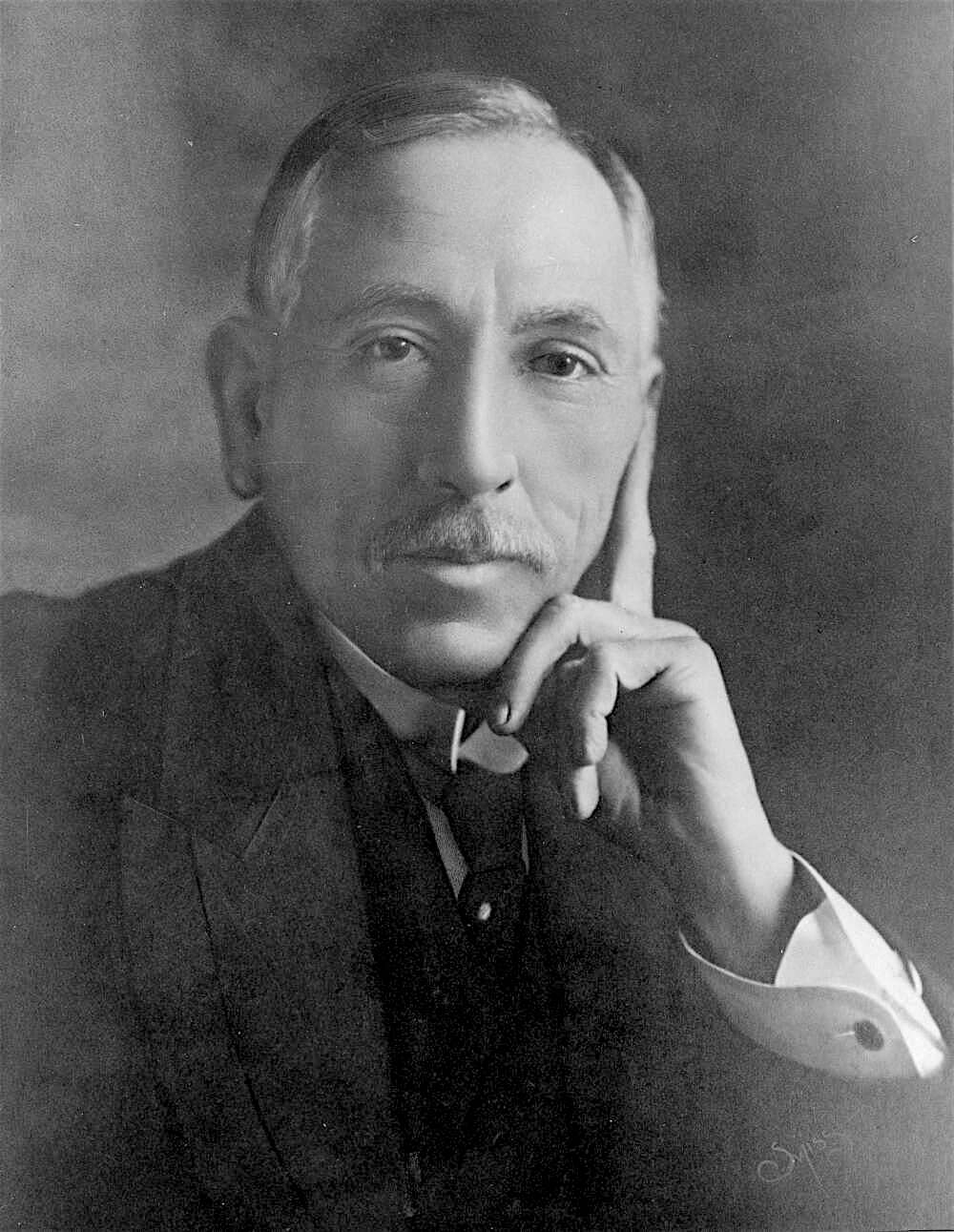
Australian Prime Minister Billy Hughes forms the National Labor Party.

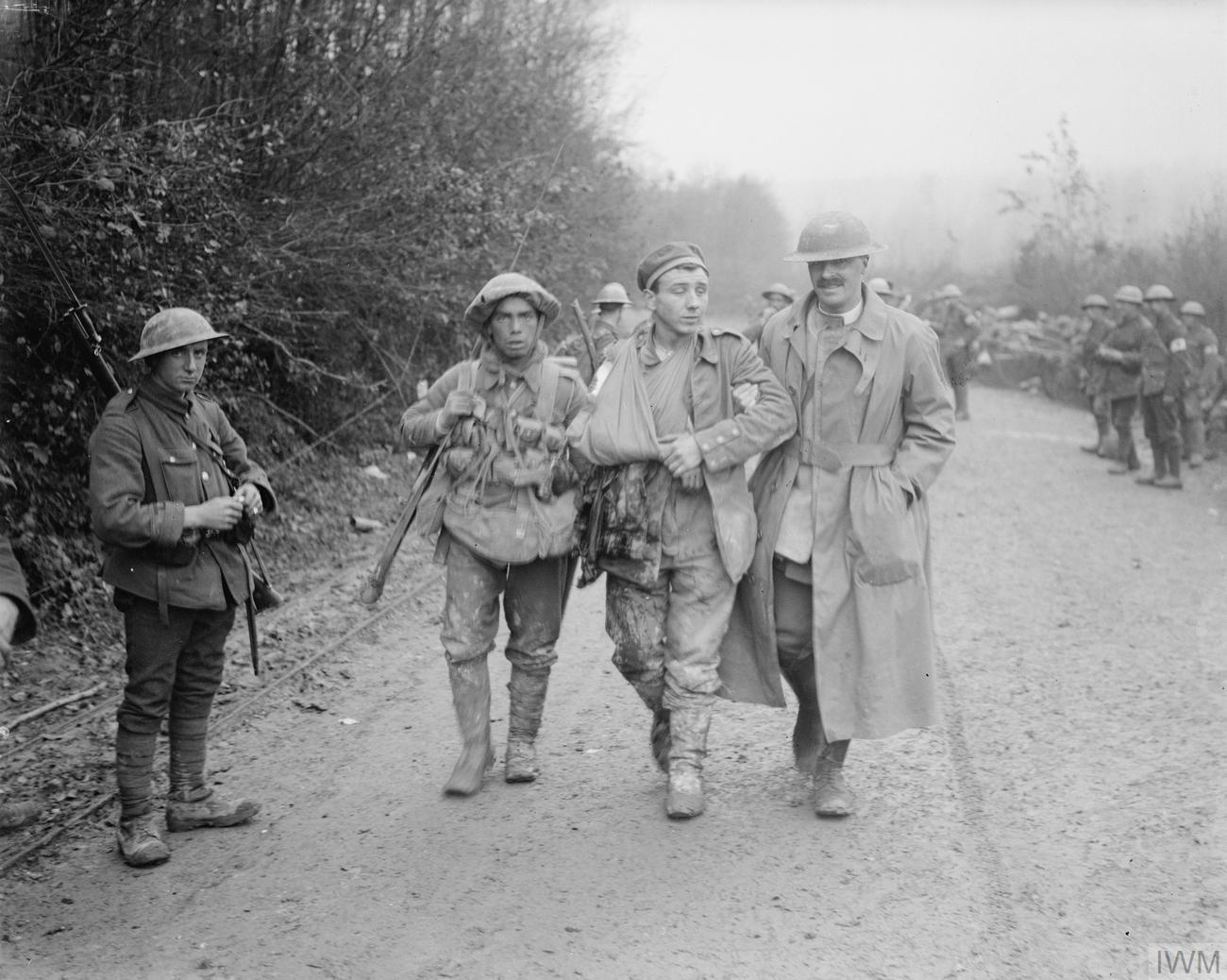
A British Army chaplain helps a wounded German prisoner away from the Battle of the Ancre.

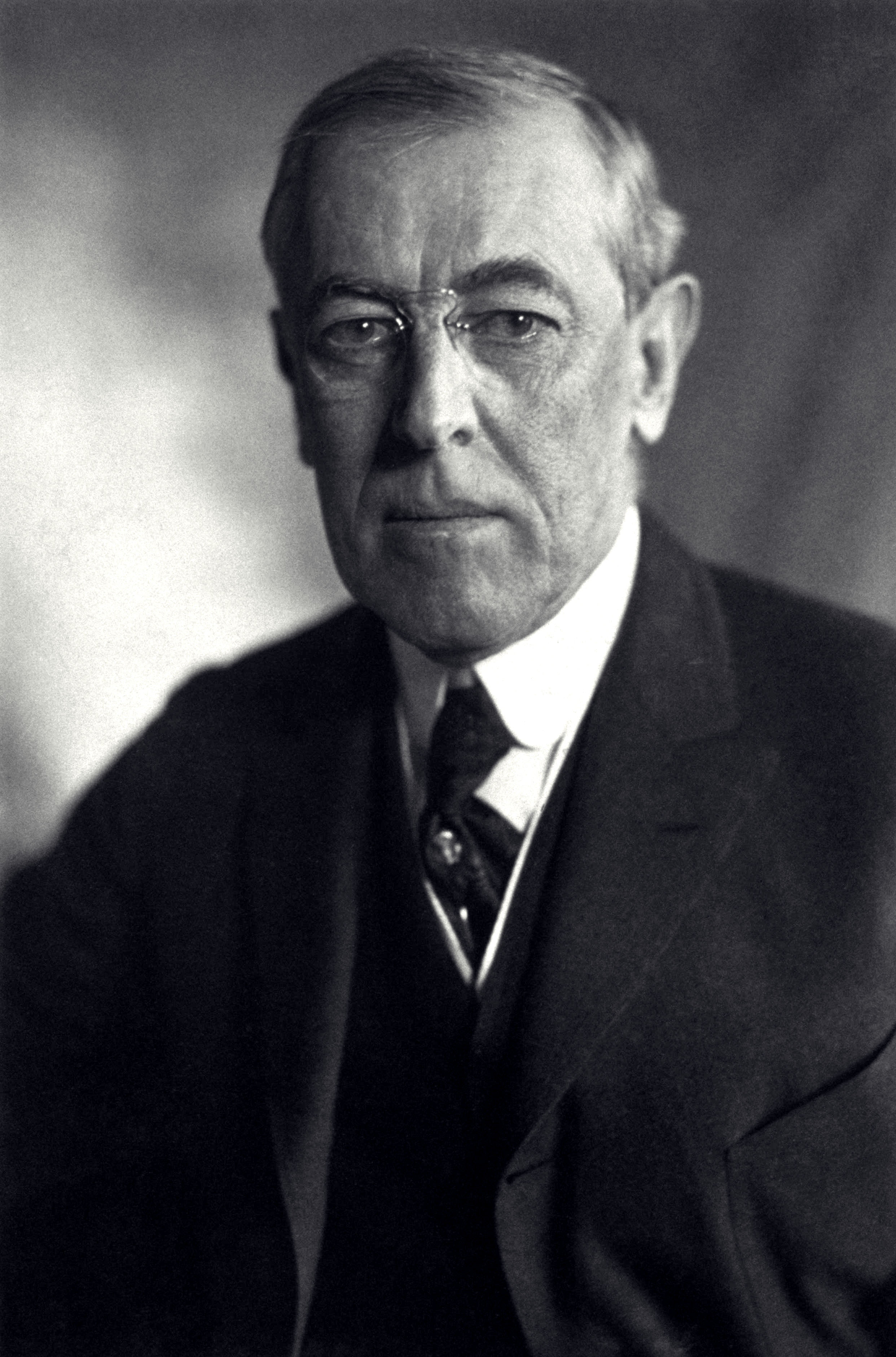
U.S. President Woodrow Wilson narrowly wins the presidential election.

The following events occurred in November 1916:

== November 1, 1916 (Wednesday) ==
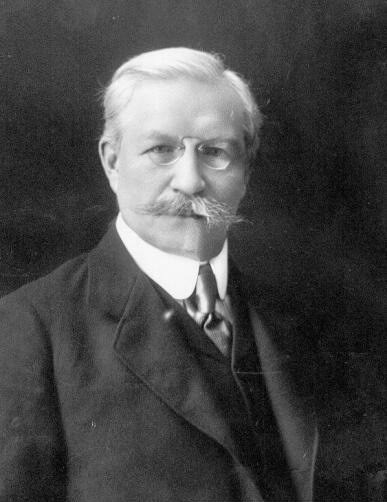
Pavel Milyukov, member of the Russian State Duma

- Ninth Battle of the Isonzo – Italy expanded its attacks on the Soča Valley and other parts of the Karst Plateau bordering Italy and Austria-Hungary.
- Romanian Campaign – Germany launched a renewed offensive to conquer the Oltenia region of Romania.
- The Australian government under Billy Hughes split over the results of the plebiscite on conscription in October, which most of the electorate voted against despite strong advocacy from Hughes.
- Pavel Milyukov, leader of the Constitutional Democratic Party in Russia, delivered his "stupidity or treason" speech in the Russian State Duma, precipitating the downfall of the Boris Shturmer government.
- American shoe manufacturer Endicott Johnson became one of the first U.S. companies to introduce the eight-hour work day, in this case for workers of the Endicott-Johnson factories in the Binghamton metropolitan area of New York.
- Italian cargo ship SS Torero was sunk in the Mediterranean Sea by German submarine SM U-21, with all crew rescued.
- The Royal Flying Corps established the No. 78 Squadron.
- The U.S. pilot training unit 3rd Aero Squadron, precursor to the 3rd Fighter Training Squadron, was established to fill in for domestic air defense when 1st Aero Squadron was assigned to support the U.S. Army and its hunt for Mexican rebel leader Pancho Villa.
- The second shortened version of the Richard Strauss opera Ariadne auf Naxos was performed in Berlin, with future runs in Zürich, Budapest and Graz, Austria.
- Born: Mohan Kumaramangalam, Indian politician, leading member of the Communist Party of India and member of the Indira Gandhi cabinet from 1972 to 1973; in London, England (killed in a plane crash, 1973)
- Died: Franz Anton von Thun und Hohenstein, 69, Austrian noble and state leader, 15th Prime Minister of Austria (b. 1847)

== November 2, 1916 (Thursday) ==
- Battle of Verdun – The Germans abandoned Fort Vaux near Verdun, France, allowing French soldiers to retake it without firing a single shot.
- Born:
  - Al Campanis, Greek-born American sports executive, general manager of the Los Angeles Dodgers from 1968 to 1987; as Alexander Sebastian Campanis, in Kos, Dodecanese, Kingdom of Italy (present-day Greece) (d. 1998)
  - Kebede Michael, Ethiopian writer, considered the nation's most prolific writer of non-fiction, poetry and drama including A Spark of Knowledge and The Light of the Mind; in Debre Birhan, Ethiopian Empire (present-day Ethiopia) (d. 1998)
- Died:
  - Frank Hugh O'Donnell, 70, Irish politician, leading member of the Irish Parliamentary Party, Member of Parliament for Dungarvan, Ireland from 1877 to 1885 (b. 1846)
  - Sarah Francisco, 77, Irish-Australian housekeeper, racked up a record 295 public drunkenness convictions in Australia before sobering in 1910 when she joined The Salvation Army (b. 1839)

== November 3, 1916 (Friday) ==
- British passenger ship Connemara collided with British cargo ship Retriever off the coast of Ireland, killing 97 passengers and crew.
- Anglo-Egyptian Darfur Expedition – A British force of 150 men was dispatched to the Sudanese mountain village of Kulme, outside of the regional capital of El Fasher, to locate Sultan Ali Dinar of the Sultanate of Darfur. The leader of a rebellion against British colonial rule in what is now Sudan was rumored to be hiding out there, however, the British force found the village deserted.
- French destroyer Yatagan collided with British cargo ship Teviot and sank in the English Channel, with all crew rescued.
- The first Gala Day was held in Geelong, Victoria, Australia to raise money for the Australian Red Cross in support of its aid efforts during World War I.

== November 4, 1916 (Saturday) ==
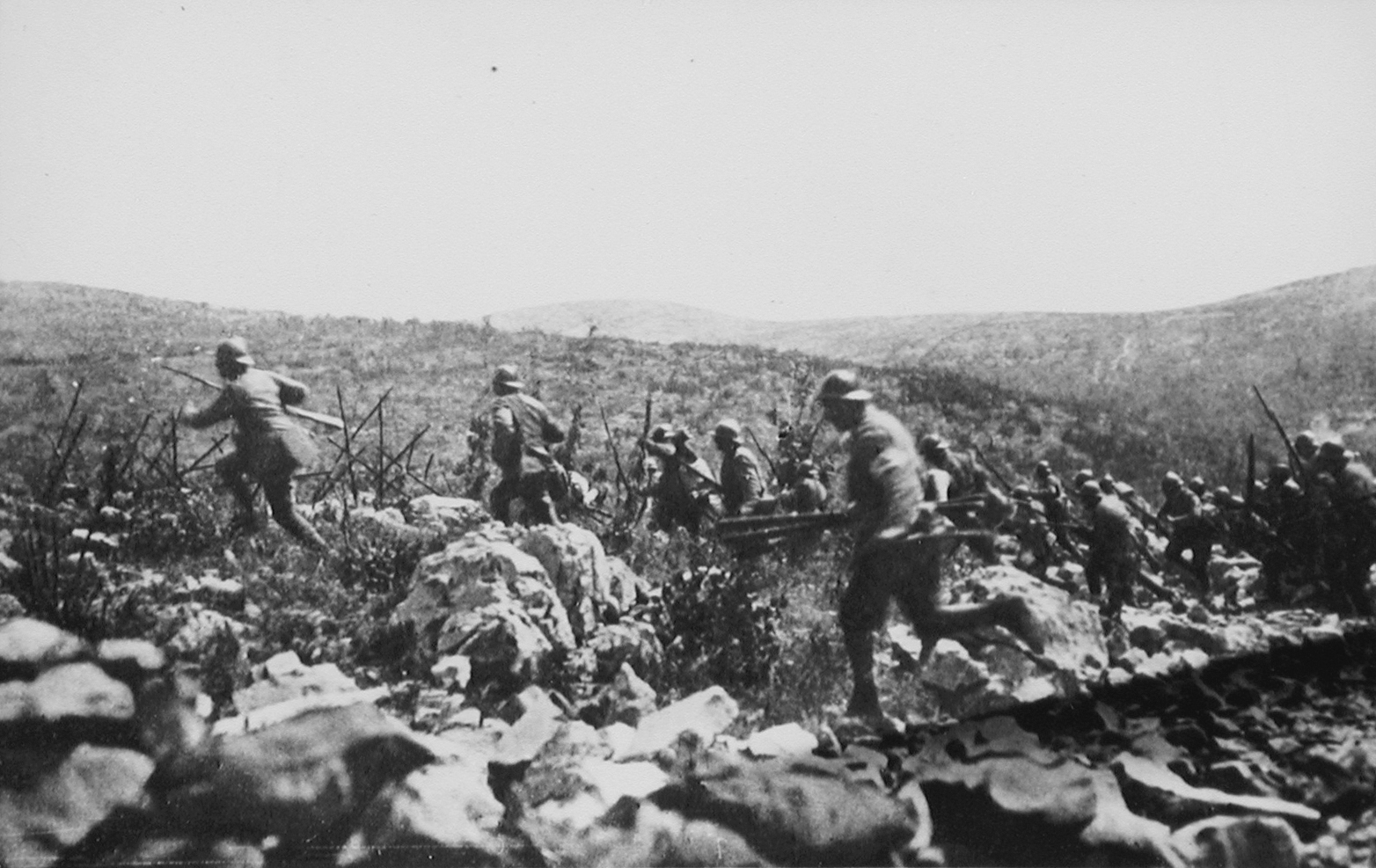
Italian infantry leaving trenches at Isonzo.

- Ninth Battle of the Isonzo – The battle ended in a stalemate with Italians suffering 75,000 casualties and the Austro-Hungarians sustaining 63,000.
- German submarine SM U-20, which sank British ocean liner RMS Lusitania the previous year, ran aground off the coast of Denmark and was scuttled the following day.
- Born:
  - John Basilone, American marine, recipient of the Medal of Honor for action during the Guadalcanal campaign; in Buffalo, New York, United States (killed in action at Battle of Iwo Jima, 1945)
  - Walter Cronkite, American television journalist, anchorman for CBS Evening News from 1962 to 1981, most significantly announcing to the American viewing public the assassination of John F. Kennedy in Dallas and the first Moon landing in 1969; in St. Joseph, Missouri, United States (d. 2009)
  - Ruth Handler, American inventor, co-founder of Mattel with husband Elliot Handler which produced popular toys as Barbie and Hot Wheels; as Ruth Marianna Mosko, in Denver, United States (d. 2002)
- Died: James D. Moffat, 70, American academic, third president of Washington & Jefferson College (b. 1846)

== November 5, 1916 (Sunday) ==
- The Kingdom of Poland was proclaimed by a joint act of the emperors of Germany and Austria-Hungary.
- Battle of Verdun – France gained all the ground lost to the Germans since February 24, allowing them to suspend military operations for a month for the soldiers to rest and be reequipped.
- Battle of Le Transloy – British forces made one last attack on the German-held Butte de Warlencourt burial ground, with a loss of c. 1,000 casualties.
- Anglo-Egyptian Darfur Expedition – The British forces relocated and began final pursuit of rebel leader Sultan Ali Dinar along with the remainder of his men still loyal to him.
- An armed confrontation between 300 striking dock workers and 200 citizen "vigilantes" organized by the sheriff of Everett, Washington resulted in 5 killed and 20 wounded, in what was known at the Everett massacre.
- A British submarine on patrol in the North Sea was able to attack and damage two out of four ships in a German squadron. While there no major casualties and all German ships were able to return to port, it resulted in Germany shifting its naval offensive from surface ships to submarines.
- Honan Chapel, built by the Irish Arts and Crafts movement, was dedicated at University College Cork in Ireland.
- Born: Jim Tabor, American baseball player, third baseman for the Boston Red Sox from 1938 to 1944 and Philadelphia Phillies from 1946 to 1947; as James Reubin Tabor, in New Hope, Alabama, United States (d. 1953)

== November 6, 1916 (Monday) ==
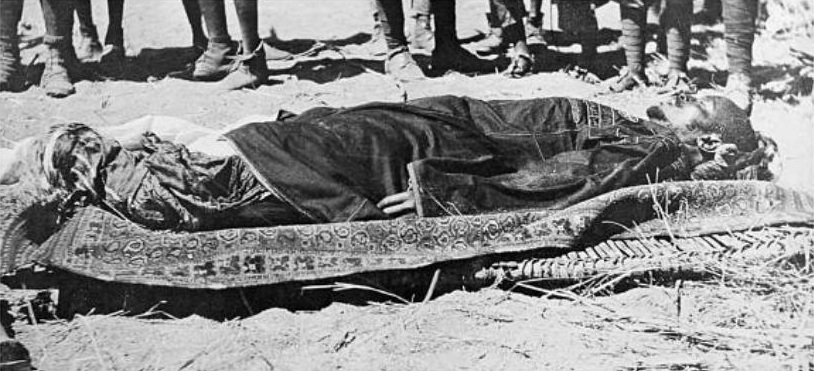
The body of Ali Dinar, November 1916

- Anglo-Egyptian Darfur Expedition – British colonial troops tracked down rebel leader Sultan Ali Dinar's camp and engaged the last of his troops. Most fled soon after the fighting started and Dinar's body was found in the camp shot through the head. The Sultan's death ended the Sultanate of Darfur where afterward it was absorbed into the Sudan.
- German submarine SM UB-45 struck a mine and sank in the Black Sea, killing 16 of her crew.
- German submarine SM UB-43 fired a torpedo on British armed passenger ship Arabia in the Mediterranean Sea. It hit the engine room and killed 11 ship engineers but the rest of the 187 passengers and crew on board were able to abandon ship and be rescued.
- American cargo ship Chester A. Congdon ran aground in Lake Superior. It capsized two days later, the first time a ship valued over $1 million was lost in the Great Lakes.
- Kilauea Military Camp was established on the Big Island of Hawaii within Hawaiʻi Volcanoes National Park as a leisure retreat for U.S. soldiers.
- Born:
  - Ray Conniff, American jazz musician, best known for his group the Ray Conniff Singers during the 1960s and best-selling albums 'S Wonderful! and Dance the Bop!; as Joseph Raymond Conniff, in Attleboro, Massachusetts, United States (d. 2002)
  - Seth J. McKee, American air force officer, commander of the North American Aerospace Defense Command from 1969 to 1973; in McGehee, Arkansas, United States (d. 2016)
  - Lauri Pekuri, Finnish air force officer, commander of Karelia Air Command, fighter ace during World War II and first Finn to break the sound barrier; as Lauri Olavi Ohukainen, in Helsinki, Grand Duchy of Finland, Russian Empire (present-day Finland) (d. 1999)

== November 7, 1916 (Tuesday) ==
- Democratic U.S. President Woodrow Wilson narrowly defeated Republican Charles E. Hughes in the U.S. presidential election.
- Republican Jeannette Rankin of Montana became the first woman elected to the United States House of Representatives.
- Battle of the Crna Bend – The Allies concentrated intense shelling of Bulgarian defenses between the towns of Krape and Polog along the Crna River in Macedonia.
- A streetcar loaded with passengers in Boston plunged off an open draw bridge into the Fort Point Channel, killing 46 people.
- Born:
  - Galaktion Alpaidze, Soviet army officer, chief of the Plesetsk Cosmodrome (spaceport) from 1963 to 1975, recipient of the USSR State Prize; in Kursebi, Russian Empire (present-day Tkibuli Municipality, Georgia) (d. 2006)
  - George William Gregory Bird, British medical researcher, established the modern blood donation system in Great Britain; in Bombay, British India (present-day Mumbai, India) (d. 1997)
  - Norman Wengert, American political scientist, author of Natural Resources and the Political Struggle; in Milwaukee, United States (d. 2001)
  - George W. Gibbs Jr., American naval serviceman, first African American to set foot on Antarctica; in Jacksonville, Florida, United States (d. 2000)
  - H. Louis Nichols, American lawyer, only attorney to see Lee Harvey Oswald while he was in custody by the Dallas Police Department after the assassination of President John F. Kennedy; in Collin County, Texas, United States (d. 2010)
- Died:
  - Marie Heim-Vögtlin, 71, Swiss physician, first Swiss woman to practice medicine and co-founder of Switzerland's first gynecological hospital (b. 1845)
  - Henry Ward Ranger, 58, American artist, founder of the Old Lyme Art Colony (b. 1858)

== November 8, 1916 (Wednesday) ==
- Japanese manufacturer NSK Ltd. was established to produce industrial bearings.
- Born:
  - Hans Beißwenger, German fighter pilot, recipient of the Knight's Cross of the Iron Cross for action as fighter pilot for the Luftwaffe over the Eastern Front (World War II) during World War II; in Schwäbisch Hall, German Empire (present-day Germany) (killed in action, 1943)
  - Andrés Fleitas, Cuban baseball player, catcher and first baseman for the Cuba national team, most valuable player during the 1942 Amateur World Series; in Santa Clara Province, Cuba (d. 2011)
  - Peter Weiss, German playwright, best known for plays Marat/Sade and The Investigation, and his novel The Aesthetics of Resistance; in Babelsberg, German Empire (present-day Germany) (d. 1982)
- Died: Cai E, 33, Chinese revolutionary leader, Governor of Yunnan from 1911 to 1913 and opposition leader to Yuan Shikai; died of tuberculosis (b. 1882)

== November 9, 1916 (Thursday) ==
- Born:
  - Bull Allen, Australian soldier, recipient of the Military Medal from the British Army and the Silver Star from U.S. Armed Forces for action during World War II; as Leslie Charles Allen, in Ballarat East, Victoria, Australia (d. 1982)
  - Martha Settle Putney, American historian, one of the first African American women to be a member of the Women's Army Corps, chronicled the roles of African American women in the U.S. Armed Forces; in Norristown, Pennsylvania, United States (d. 2008)
- Died: Ion Dragalina, 55, Romanian general, commander of the 1st Infantry Division of Romania; died from wounds received in October (b. 1860)

== November 10, 1916 (Friday) ==
- Battle of the Crna Bend – After three days of constant shelling from the Allies, Bulgaria was forced to abandon all of its defensive positions along the Crna River in Macedonia, allowing Serbian forces to take them over.
- Boris Stürmer resigned as Prime Minister of Russia at the urging of Nicholas II of Russia and was replaced by Alexander Trepov.
- Born: Billy May, American composer, best known for TV show themes including The Green Hornet, The Mod Squad, and Naked City, and collaborations with Frank Sinatra and Nat King Cole; as Edward William May Jr., in Pittsburgh, United States (d. 2004)
- Died:
  - Walter Sutton, 39, American geneticist, co-developer of the Boveri–Sutton chromosome theory (b. 1877)
  - Eduard Nápravník, 77, Czech composer and conductor, principal conductor of the Mariinsky Theatre in Saint Petersburg (b. 1839)

== November 11, 1916 (Saturday) ==
- Battle of the Ancre Heights – Canadian forces captured the last of the Regina Trench north of Le Sars, France, from the Germans, ending the battle. Canadian casualties for the Battle of the Somme at that point had reached 24,029 men, roughly 24 percent of the Canadian Corps.
- Born: Jaroslav Otruba, Czech architect, designer of the Prague Metro; in Olomouc, Austria-Hungary (present-day Czech Republic (d. 2007)
- Died: José María Caro Martínez, 86, Chilean politician, first Mayor of Pichilemu (b. 1830)

== November 12, 1916 (Sunday) ==
- The Japanese battleship Ise was launched by Kawasaki Heavy Industries in Kobe but would not see major military service until World War II.
- Born:
  - Rogelio de la Rosa, Filipino actor and politician, member of the Senate of the Philippines from 1957 to 1963; as Regidor Lim de la Rosa, in Lubao, Philippine Islands (present-day Philippines) (d. 1986)
  - John Robert Mills, British physicist, one of the lead developers of radar for British defenses during World War II; in Surrey, England (d. 1998)
  - Verne Orr, American cabinet member, 14th United States Secretary of the Air Force; as George Vernon Orr Jr., in Des Moines, Iowa, United States (d. 2008)
- Died: Percival Lowell, 61, American astronomer, founder of the Lowell Observatory in Flagstaff, Arizona (b. 1855)

== November 13, 1916 (Monday) ==
- Battle of the Ancre – The newly formed British Fifth Army launched the final offensive of the Battle of the Somme with the capture of Hawthorn Ridge, an objective the British failed to take on the first day of battle back on July 1.
- Australian Prime Minister Billy Hughes was expelled from the Australian Labor Party over his support for conscription, although Hughes was quoted years later on the experience: "I did not leave the Labor Party; the party left me."
- Died: Frederick Septimus Kelly, 35, Australian rower, gold medalist in the 1908 Summer Olympics; killed in action during Battle of the Somme (b. 1881)

== November 14, 1916 (Tuesday) ==
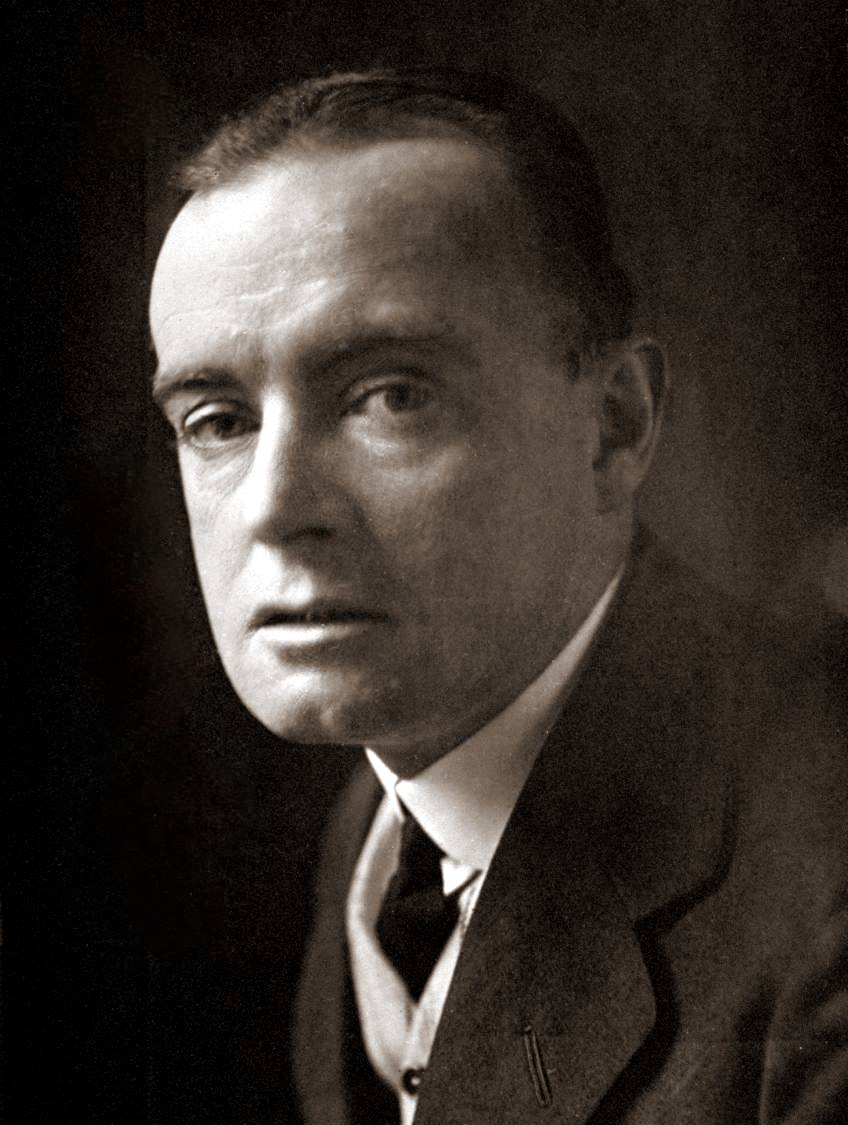
H.H. Munro, aka Saki

- After being expelled from the Australian Labor Party, Australian Prime Minister Billy Hughes formed the National Labor Party with 24 other former Labor Party members, but merged with another political next year to become the Nationalist Party of Australia.
- French troopship SS Burdigala struck a mine and sank off the coast of Greece, with the loss of one life.
- A German sniper shot and killed H.H. Munro, better known by his pen name Saki, at the Battle of the Ancre.
- The Australian government established the Department of Home and Territories and the Department of Works and Railways, with both departments dissolved respectively in 1928 and 1932.
- The Canadian Forestry Corps was established to handle the demand for wood supplies for the Allied trenches on the Western Front.
- Born:
  - Sherwood Schwartz, American television producer, creator of popular TV programs including Gilligan's Island and The Brady Bunch; in Passaic, New Jersey, United States (d. 2011)
  - Ellen Neel, Canadian aboriginal artist, first woman to professionally carve totem poles; in Alert Bay, British Columbia, Canada (d. 1966)

== November 15, 1916 (Wednesday) ==
- Romanian Campaign – The city of Târgu Jiu fell to German forces as they moved further into the Oltenia region of Romania.
- Battle of the Ancre – British forces captured the French commune of Beaumont Hamel on the Ancre River.
- Born:
  - Bill Melendez, Mexican-American animator, chief animator and producer of the Peanuts cartoon series, voice of Snoopy and Woodstock, also animator for Pinocchio, Fantasia, Dumbo and Bambi; as José Cuauhtémoc Melendez, in Hermosillo, Sonora, Mexico (d. 2008)
  - Edward M. Davis, American law enforcer, Chief of the Los Angeles Police Department from 1969 to 1978, well-known technical adviser for 1960s TV cop shows Dragnet and Adam-12; in Los Angeles, United States (d. 2006)
  - Nita Barrow, Barbados state leader, first and only woman to hold the seat of Governor-General of Barbados, sister to Errol Barrow; as Ruth Nita Barrow, in Saint Lucy, Barbados (d. 1995)
- Died:
  - Henryk Sienkiewicz, 70, Polish writer, recipient of the Nobel Prize in Literature for his historical novels including Quo Vadis (b. 1846)
  - Molly Elliot Seawell, 56, American novelist, known popular novels including Paul Jones and The Fortunes of Fifi; died of cancer (b. 1860)
  - Luis Muñoz Rivera, 57, Puerto Rican poet and statesman, Resident Commissioner of Puerto Rico from 1911 to 1916 (b. 1859)

== November 16, 1916 (Thursday) ==
- The two-story train station opened by the California Southern Railroad in San Bernardino, California was destroyed by fire.
- Samuel Waring formed the Nieuport & General Aircraft Company in Cricklewood, London, to build Nieuport 11 and later Nieuport 17, Sopwith Camel, and Sopwith Snipe military aircraft for the British war effort.
- The 4th Mounted Division of the British Army was disbanded.
- British racer Dario Resta won the 11th and final running of the original Vanderbilt Cup at Santa Monica, California driving a Peugeot EX3.
- The Flushing elevated train station of Queensboro Plaza opened for service in New York City, followed later by the complementing Astoria line on February 1, 1917.
- Born:
  - Daws Butler, American voice actor, voiced famous Hanna-Barbera animated characters including Yogi Bear, Quick Draw McGraw, Snagglepuss, and Huckleberry Hound; as Charles Dawson Butler, in Toledo, Ohio, United States (d. 1988)
  - Christopher Strachey, English computer scientist, founder of denotational semantics, developer of the programming language CPL; in Hampstead, England (d. 1975)
  - John Forfar, British physician, one of the main founders of the Royal College of Paediatrics and Child Health; in Glasgow, Scotland (d. 2013)
  - Herb Green, New Zealand physician, lead physician on women's health for Auckland City Hospital, center of the controversial Cartwright Inquiry in the 1980s; as George Herbert Green, in Balclutha, New Zealand (d. 2001)

== November 17, 1916 (Friday) ==
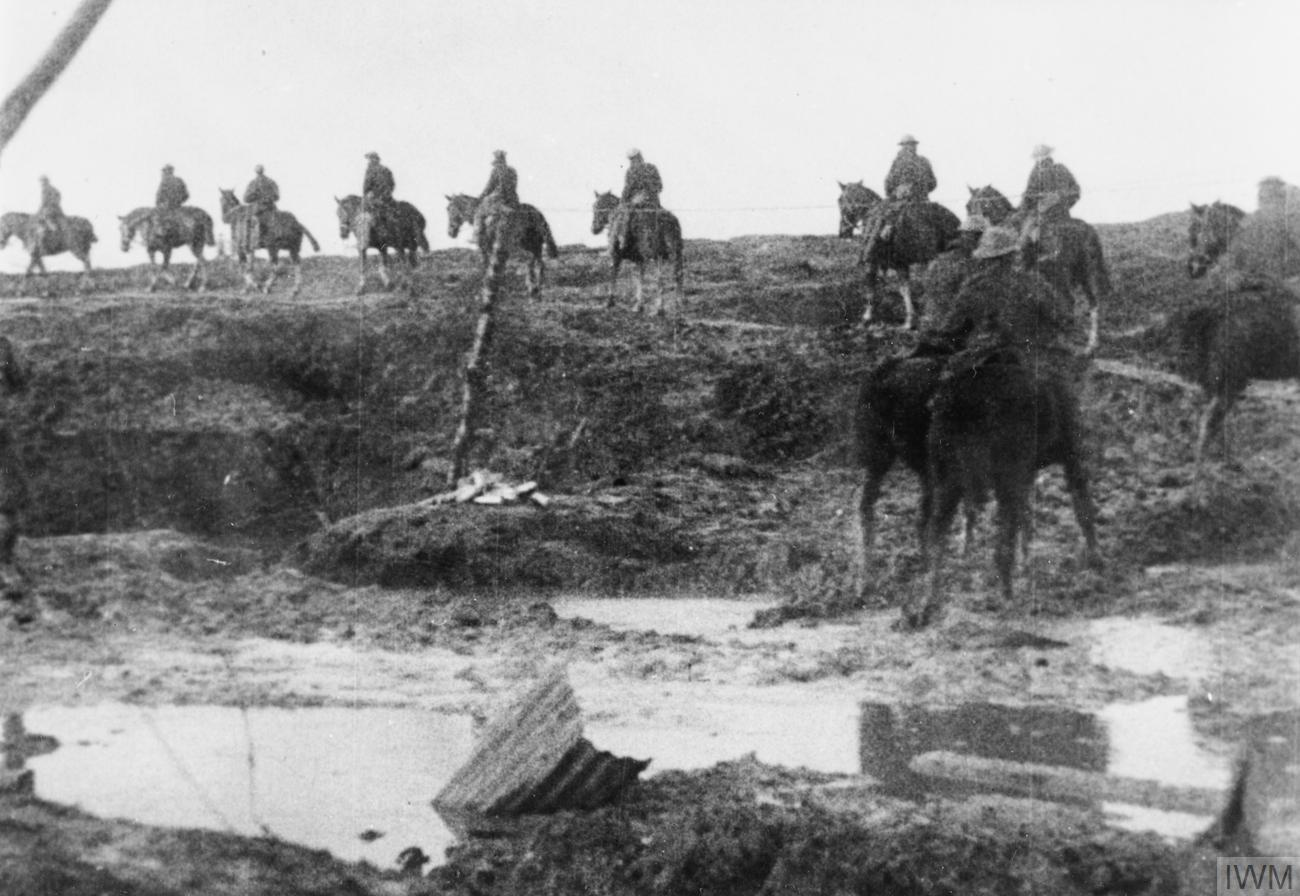
British cavalry on the Ancre

- Battle of the Ancre – British forces attacked and briefly held Serre, France, from the Germans.
- The football rivalry between the Rice University Owls and Southern Methodist University Mustangs began with the Owls winning a very one-sided victory of 127–3. Since both schools joined the Southwest Conference in 1918, the two teams over the century have met 90 times with the SMU Mustangs leading 48–41–1.
- Born:
  - Shelby Foote, American historian and novelist, author of The Civil War: A Narrative; in Greenville, Mississippi, United States (d. 2005)
  - Károly Szabó, Hungarian diplomat, collaborator with Raoul Wallenberg on rescuing Jews from the Holocaust while a member of the Swedish Embassy; in Budapest, Austria-Hungary (present-day Hungary) (d. 1964)
  - José López Rega, Argentine politician, cabinet minister under the Juan Perón administration in the 1970s; in Buenos Aires, Argentina (d. 1989)
  - Winson Hudson, American activist, first vice-president of the National Association for the Advancement of Colored People and one of the first organizers of the first Head Start program; as Anger Winson Gates, in Carthage, Mississippi, United States (d. 2004)
  - Atmaram Bhairav Joshi, Indian agricultural scientist, credited as a major leader in the Green Revolution in India (d. 2010); Shobhna Samarth, Indian film actress, known for leading films including Ram Rajya; in Bombay, British India (present-day Mumbai, India) (d. 2000)
- Died: Vicente Lukbán, 56, Filipino army officer, military chief in the Philippine–American War (b. 1860)

== November 18, 1916 (Saturday) ==
- Battle of the Somme – British Expeditionary Force commander Douglas Haig called off further offensives following the wind-down of fighting at the Battle of the Ancre. The order ended four-and-a-half months of offensives that began July 1, and while a tactical British victory, was also one of the costliest battles of World War I:
  - Total British casualties, including Commonwealth allies Australia, Canada, New Zealand, South Africa and the Dominion of Newfoundland were 419,654, including 95,675 killed or missing, and 782 aircraft and 576 pilots shot down (although the British retained their air superiority).
  - Total French casualties were 204,253, including 50,756 killed or missing.
  - Total German casualties were estimated between 465,000 and 600,000, including 164,055 killed or missing and 38,000 taken prisoner.
- Battle of the Ancre – German forces forced the British out at Serre, France but lost ground elsewhere, ending the battle in a tactical victory for the British. While the British suffered 23,274 casualties, the Germans suffered more from the start of November with 45,000 casualties including 7,183 prisoners.
- American racers Howdy Wilcox and Johnny Aitken won the 7th and final running of the American Grand Prize at Santa Monica, California driving a Peugeot EX5 over 648.934 km (13.519 km x 48 laps) in a time of in 4:42:47. The race would not be revived until 1958 as the Formula One United States Grand Prix.
- Died: Francis M. Lyman, 76, American religious leader, President of the Quorum of the Twelve Apostles for the Church of Jesus Christ of Latter-day Saints from 1903 to 1916 (b. 1840)

== November 19, 1916 (Sunday) ==
- Battle of the Crna Bend – Bulgaria was forced to retreat from the city of Bitola, Macedonia and reset the front five kilometers north between Baba Mountain and the village of Gradešnica. There were casualties for Bulgaria but numbers were not recorded. Allied losses were estimated between 600 and 2,000 casualties.
- American female pilot Ruth Law set a new distance record for cross-country flight by flying 590 miles (950 km) non-stop from Chicago to New York State, then flying on to New York City the next day.
- Born: Edward C. Banfield, American political scientist, adviser to U.S. Presidents Richard Nixon, Gerald Ford and Ronald Reagan, author of The Moral Basis of a Backward Society; in Bloomfield, Connecticut, United States (d. 1999)

== November 20, 1916 (Monday) ==
- The first two groups of the South African Native Labour Corps arrived in France and were primarily used to operate the docks at French ports during World War I. Eventually, 21,000 black South Africans were working in France until the unit was disbanded in 1918.
- The Justice Party of India was established by Brahmin leaders T. M. Nair and P. Theagaraya Chetty in Madras.
- Born:
  - Evelyn Keyes, American actress, best known for the role of Suellen O'Hara in Gone with the Wind; in Port Arthur, Texas, United States (d. 2008)
  - Nils Erik Bæhrendtz, Swedish academic and TV personality, best known as one of the commentators for the Swedish nightly news show Aktuellt; in Stockholm, Sweden (d. 2002)
  - Donald T. Campbell, American social scientist, developed concept of evolutionary epistemology; in Grass Lake, Michigan, United States (d. 1996)
  - James Pope-Hennessy, English biographer and travel writer, author of Aspects of Provence and Sins of the Fathers, son of Richard Pope-Hennessy; in London, England (murdered, 1974)
- Died: Georges Trouillot, 65, French politician, held various French ministry positions including Ministry of the Colonies, Ministry of Commerce (b. 1851)

== November 21, 1916 (Tuesday) ==
- Battle of Bucharest – The Central Powers completed their cross of the Danube River at Sistova and occupied the regional capital of Craiova, Romania.
- Hospital ship HMHS Britannic, designed as the third Olympic-class ocean liner for the White Star Line, sank in the Kea Channel of the Aegean Sea after hitting a mine, with 30 lives lost. At 48,158 gross register tons, she was the largest ship lost during the war.
- Franz Joseph I of Austria died of pneumonia at the Schönbrunn Palace in Vienna after a reign of 68 years and was succeeded by his grandnephew Charles I.
- The Breguet 14 aircraft began operation.
- Born:
  - Sid Luckman, American football player, quarterback for the Chicago Bears from 1939 to 1950; as Sidney Luckman, in New York City, United States (d. 1998)
  - Jadunath Singh, Indian soldier, recipient of the Param Vir Chakra for action during Indo-Pakistani War of 1947; in Shahjahanpur, British India (present-day India) (killed in action, 1948)

== November 22, 1916 (Wednesday) ==
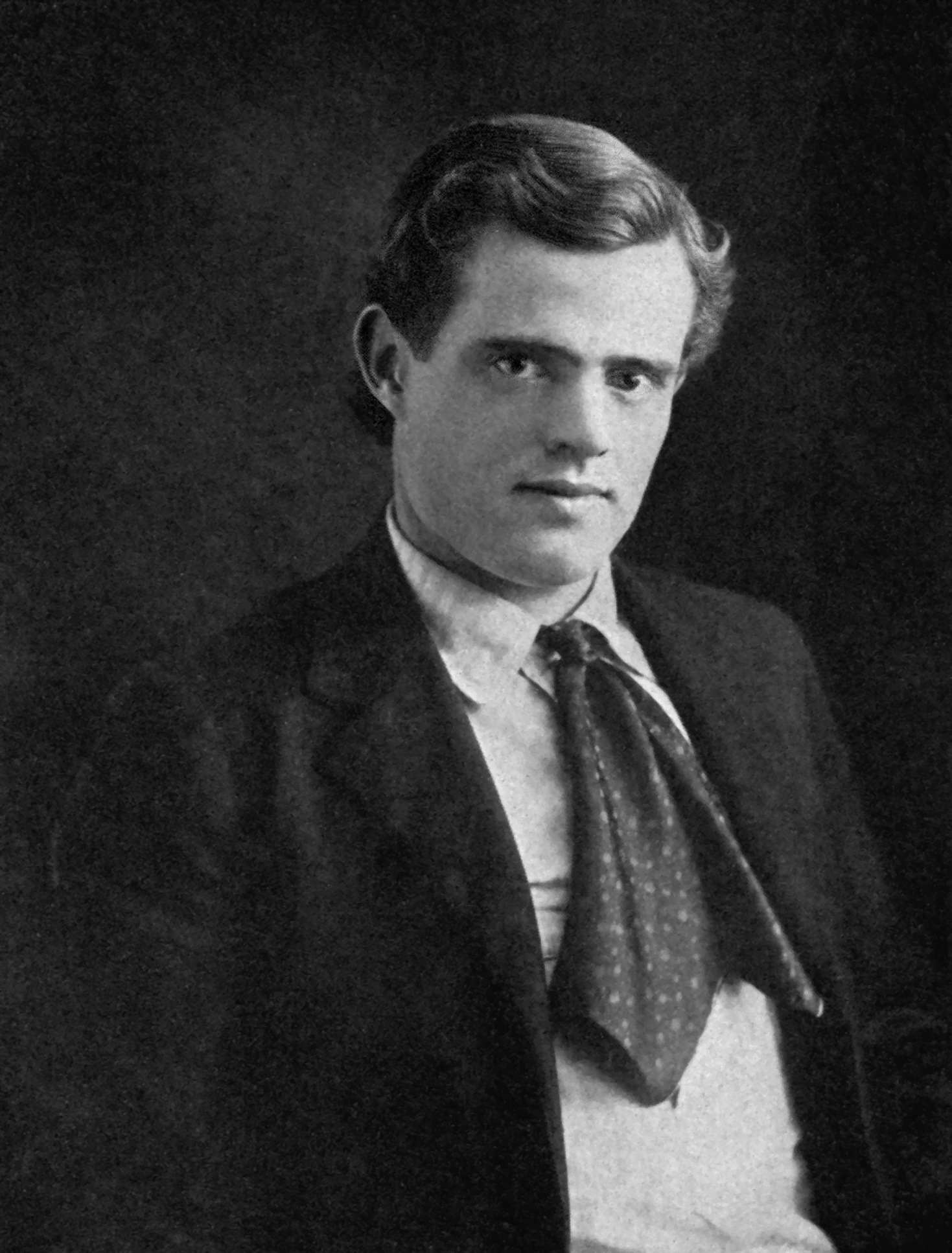
Jack London

- The first three prototypes of the Royal Aircraft Factory S.E.5 were flown in England.
- Born: Amo Bessone, American hockey player and coach, head hockey coach for Michigan State University from 1951 to 1979; Sagamore, Massachusetts, United States (d. 2010)
- Died:
  - Jack London, 40, American writer, author of White Fang, Call of the Wild and The Sea-Wolf (b. 1876)
  - Ida Dixon, 61, American socialite and golf course architect, first woman to design golf courses including the Springhaven Country Club golf course in Wallingford, Pennsylvania (b. 1854)
  - Charles C. Cordill, 71, American politician, member of the Louisiana State Senate from 1884 to 1912 (b. 1845)
  - George White, 62, British industrialist, pioneered construction of electrical tramways including the Bristol Tramways, co-founder of the Bristol Aeroplane Company (b. 1854)

== November 23, 1916 (Thursday) ==
- Battle of Robănești – Three squadrons with the Romanian First Army launched a frontal attack on German artillery positions at Robănești, Romania. Casualties were heavy including the complete loss of one squadron in an attempt to dislodge the artillery.
- British ace Lanoe Hawker, flying an Airco DH.2, engaged in a lengthy dog fight with Manfred von Richthofen (who was flying in an Albatros D.II. Richthofen prevailed, shooting down and killing Hawker. Hawker's score stood at seven kills at the time of his death, and he was von Richthofen's 11th victory. Hawker was awarded the Victoria Cross posthumously.
- Harlan Brewster became Premier of British Columbia, replacing William John Bowser.
- St Martin's Theatre opened in West End of London with the Edwardian musical comedy Houp La!, starring Gertie Millar. The theatre is most famous for the longest continuous run of a play when it premiered the Agatha Christie mystery The Mousetrap in 1974.
- Born:
  - Michael Gough, British actor, best known for playing Alfred Pennyworth in the Tim Burton/Joel Schumacher Batman series, as well as a regular in Hammer-produced horror films including Dracula; as Francis Michael Gough, in Kuala Lumpur, Federated Malay States (present-day Malaysia) (d. 2011)v
  - P. K. Page, British-Canadian poet, recipient of the Governor General's Award for her poetry collection The Metal and the Flower; as Patricia Kathleen Page, in Swanage, Dorset, England (d. 2010)
  - Ken Kavanaugh, American football player, played end for the Chicago Bears from 1940 to 1950; as Kenneth William Kavanaugh, in Little Rock, Arkansas, United States (d. 2007)
- Died: Charles Booth, 76, English sociologist and reformer, advocated for poverty reduction reforms including the establishment of the Old Age Pensions Act 1908 (b. 1840)

== November 24, 1916 (Friday) ==
- French officials met with Albanian nationalist leader Themistokli Gërmenji to discuss governance of Albania after the liberation of Korçë from Bulgaria.
- Born:
  - Forrest J Ackerman, American writer, editor and principal writer of sci-fi/horror film fan magazine Famous Monsters of Filmland; in Los Angeles, United States (d. 2008)
  - Frankie Muse Freeman, American civil right activist and lawyer, first woman to be appointed to the United States Commission on Civil Rights; as Marie Frankie Muse, in Danville, Virginia, United States (d. 2018)
  - Villu Toots, Estonian artist, known for masterwork in calligraphy in books such as Tänapäeva kiri; in Reval, Russian Empire (present-day Tallinn, Estonia) (d. 1993)
- Died:
  - Hiram Maxim, 76, American firearms inventor, developed the first portable machine gun (b. 1840)
  - Princess Adelheid, 82, German noble, last Duchess of Nassau from 1851 until 1866 and Grand Duchess of Luxembourg from 1890 until 1905 (b. 1833)
  - John Francis Barnett, 79, British composer, best known for his choral compositions including The Ancient Mariner and The Raising of Lazarus (b. 1837)

== November 25, 1916 (Saturday) ==
- David Beatty replaced John Jellicoe as commander of the Grand Fleet. Jellicoe became First Lord of the Sea.
- Royal Navy destroyer HMS Radiant was launched by John I. Thornycroft & Company at Woolston, England, but was noted for being sold to the Royal Thai Navy in 1920 and would serve it until 1957.
- Born:
  - Peg Lynch, American radio producer and writer, best known for her popular 1940s radio show Ethel and Albert; as Margaret Frances Lynch, in Lincoln, Nebraska, United States (d. 2015)
  - Clyde M. Narramore, American psychologist and evangelist, best known for his faith-based psychology books and radio show Psychology for Living; in Palo Verde, Arizona, United States (d. 2015)
- Died:
  - Frank Desprez, 63, English poet and playwright, best known for his poem Lasca and his work with collaborations with Richard D'Oyly Carte (b. 1853)
  - Inez Milholland, 30, American suffragist, leading member of the National Woman's Party and key organizer of the Woman suffrage parade of 1913 (b. 1886)

== November 26, 1916 (Sunday) ==
- Battle of Bucharest – After failing to stop the Central Powers advance into the province of Oltenia, Romanian forces retreated east of the Olt River and prepared to defend Bucharest.
- The French battleship Suffren was torpedoed and sunk in the Atlantic Ocean off the coast of Portugal by German submarine SM U-52, killing all 648 crew.
- Born: Bob Elliott, American baseball player, third baseman for the Pittsburgh Pirates and Boston Braves; as Robert Irving Elliott, in San Francisco, United States (d. 1966)

== November 27, 1916 (Monday) ==
- Battle of Bucharest – A combined Central Powers force of 250,000 under command of August von Mackensen began to advance on the Romanian capital, where 150,000 Romanian troops dug in to defend the city.
- Bad weather, equipment problems and improved British air defenses frustrated raiding goals for eight German Navy Zeppelins targeting industrial complexes in the British Midlands. One airship struck West Hartlepool, killing four and injuring 11 people. Royal Flying Corps Second Lieutenant Ian V. Pyott of No. 36 Squadron shot down an airship over Castle Eden, killing her entire crew including her famed commander Max Dietrich. Another three-aircraft squadron led by Flight Lieutenant Egbert Cadbury shot down L 21 off Lowestoft, England.
- British airship R.9 began operation.
- Born:
  - Chick Hearn, American basketball announcer, coined the colorful terms slam dunk, air ball, and "no harm, no foul" during play-by-play reporting for the Los Angeles Lakers; as Francis Dayle Hearn, in Aurora, Illinois, United States (d. 2002)
  - Jack Bradley, English association football player, played inside forward for Swindon Town F.C., Southampton F.C. and Bolton Wanderers F.C. from 1936 to 1955; in Hemsworth, England (d. 2002)
  - Roderick Chisholm, American philosopher, leading thinker on epistemology and philosophy of perception, author of Perceiving; in North Attleborough, Massachusetts, United States (d. 1999)
  - Henry Earl Singleton, American engineer, co-founder of Teledyne Technologies; in Haslet, Texas, United States (d. 1999)
- Died:
  - Émile Verhaeren, 61, Belgian poet, known for poetry collections including Les Soirs, Les Heures du Soir, and Les Ailes rouges de la Guerre (b. 1855)
  - John T. Struble, 88, American pioneer, one of the builders of Iowa City (b. 1828)
  - Edward Trickett, 65, Australian rower, winner of the World Sculling Championship in 1876 (b. 1851)

== November 28, 1916 (Tuesday) ==
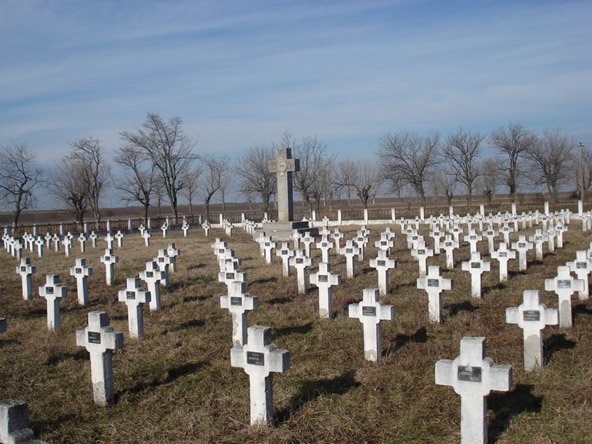
Military cemetery for Romanians killed at Battle of Prunaru.

- Battle of Prunaru – A Romanian cavalry force of 5,000 men desperately charged into enemy lines at the village of Prunaru outside of Bucharest, resulting in only 134 survivors. The charge did allow Romanian infantry time to regroup to defend the city against advancing forces of the Central Powers.
- A German aircraft struck central London for the first time during World War I, dropping six bombs near Victoria station.
- The German air squadron Jagdstaffel 25 was established in the Luftstreitkräfte (German Air Force).
- The Sydney Camera Circle was established in Sydney and would influence Australian photography for the next 50 years.
- Grant County, North Dakota was established with its county seat in Carson, North Dakota.
- Born:
  - Lilian, Princess of Réthy, English-Belgian noble, queen consort of Leopold III of Belgium; as Mary Lilian Henriette Lucie Josephine Ghislaine Baels, in London, England (d. 2002)
  - Ramón José Velásquez, Venezuelan politician, acting President of Venezuela from 1993 to 1994; in Táchira, Venezuela (d. 2014)
- Died: Martinus Theunis Steyn, 58, Boer statesman, sixth and last President of the Orange Free State (b. 1857)

== November 29, 1916 (Wednesday) ==
- French troops liberated Korçë, Albania from Bulgaria.
- British troopship Minnewaska struck a mine and was damaged off Crete in the Mediterranean Sea. She was beached but was declared a total loss.
- Born: John Arthur Love, American politician, 36th Governor of Colorado; in Gibson City, Illinois, United States (d. 2002)
- Died:
  - Abraham George Ellis, 70, Suriname-Dutch naval officer, Minister of the Navy 1903 to 1905, the only member of African descent to hold a cabinet position in the Dutch government (b. 1846)
  - John Tebbutt, 82, Australian astronomer, discovered "The Great Comet of 1861" (b. 1834)

== November 30, 1916 (Thursday) ==
- Royal Navy Q-Ship HMS Penshurst shelled and sank German U-boat SM UB-19 in the English Channel with the loss of eight of her 24 crew.
- The American Tennis Association was established in Largo, Maryland as an African-American alternative to the whites-only United States Lawn Tennis Association, and remains the oldest operating African-American sports organization in the U.S.
- Born:
  - John Franklin Bardin, American crime writer, author of The Deadly Percheron, The Last of Philip Banter and Devil Take the Blue-Tail Fly; in Cincinnati, United States (d. 1981)
  - Lim Kim San, Singaporean politician, minister of the Housing and Development Board for Singapore from 1960 and 1965 resulted in modern development of the nation; in Singapore, Straits Settlements, British Malaya (present-day Singapore) (d. 2006)
- Died: Dorrit Weixler, 24, German actress, best known for the Dorrit film comedy series from 1915 to 1916; committed suicide (b. 1892)
