= Viktor Kühne =

German officer (1857–1945)

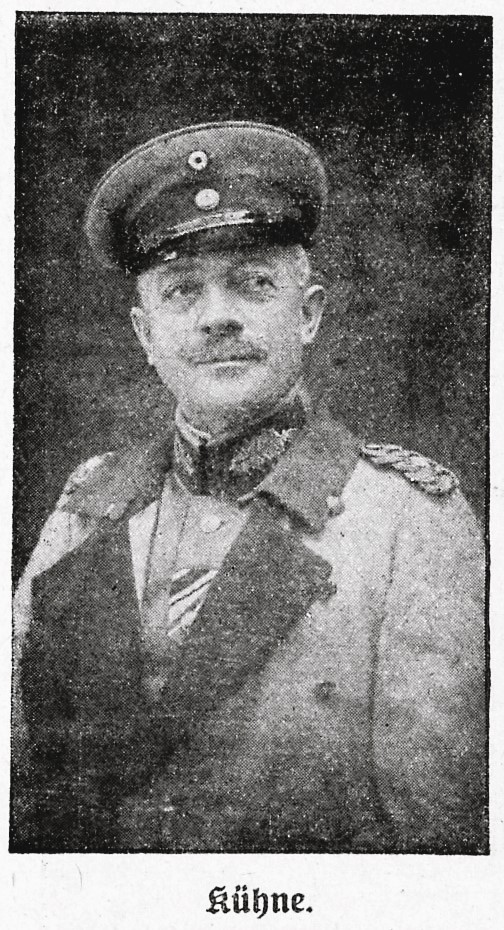
- Born: 28 March 1857; Mogilno, Province of Posen, Kingdom of Prussia
- Died: 9 February 1945 (aged 87); Ellingshausen, Gau Thuringia, Nazi Germany
- Military career
- Allegiance: German Empire; Weimar Republic
- Branch: Imperial German Army; Prussian Army
- Service years: 1876–1919
- Rank: Generalleutnant char. General of the Artillery
- Commands: 25th Division; 54th Corps; Gruppe Kühne; IX Reserve Corps; V Reserve Corps; XI Corps
- Conflicts: World War I: Second Battle of the Jiu Valley; Battle of Slatina; Battle of Robănești; Battle of Râmnicu Sărat; Battle of Amiens; Battle of Hamel
- Awards: Pour le Merite

Otto Viktor Kühne (28 March 1857 – 9 February 1945) was a German General of the Artillery who served as a corps commander during World War I.

== Biography ==
=== Earlier Years ===
Kühne was born as the son of a district administrator and after graduating from high school in 1876, he joined the Imperial German Army as a cadet in the 11th Field Artillery Regiment. He was promoted to Lieutenant in 1877 and served as battalion adjutant for years. In 1888, he was sent to study at the War Academy and afterwards transferred to the 34th Field Artillery Regiment where he was promoted to captain. In 1893, he became a teacher at the field artillery school in Jüterbog. From 1897 to 1903, Kühne worked in the War Ministry and was promoted to Major there. On 3 July 1902, he became commander of the 1st Battalion of the 10th Field Artillery Regiment and on 24 April 1904 took over as commander of the 26th Field Artillery Regiment. In this office, he was promoted to lieutenant colonel on 18 May 1905. In 1907, he was appointed commander of the training regiment of the field artillery school, where he was promoted to colonel in 1908. As overall commander of the field artillery school, he was transferred to Jüterbog in 1910. With his promotion to major general, Kühne was appointed commander of the 30th Field Artillery Brigade on 2 July 1913 in Strasbourg.

=== World War I ===
With the mobilization Kühne was appointed commander of the 25th Division, the Grand Ducal Hessian Division that was part of XVIII Corps and 4th Army. The division penetrated into Champagne via Belgium and participated in the First Battle of the Marne in September 1914. After the retreat from the Marne, the division was engaged in trench warfare near Roye. There, he was promoted to lieutenant general on 27 January 1915. A shrapnel wounded him on 29 May 1915. The division was one of the attack divisions of the 5th Army which began the attack on Verdun on 21 February 1916.

On 23 August 1916, he was appointed to temporarily lead the general command of the XII Army Corps. On 4 September 1916, the emperor appointed him commander of the newly formed 54th Corps. This was first used in Verdun, but was transferred to Hungary on 12 October.

16 days later, his command was reinforced to form the temporary Group Kühne near Petroszény. It now consisted of the 41st, 109th, 11th Bavarian and 301st infantry divisions and the Cavalry Corps Schmettow (6th and 7th cavalry divisions). On 2 December 1916, the Group Kühne fought in the Battle of the Argeș. On 6 December his divisions were in front of Bucharest. In recognition of the triumphal march, he received the order Pour le Mérite on 11 December 1616. In January 1917, he fought in the Battle of the Putna.

On 2 February 1917, he became commanding general of the IX Reserve Corps. But already on 13 March he took over the XI Corps. In the Battle of the Aisne he led the Group Vailly; receiving the star of the Order of the Red Eagle (2nd class with oak leaves and swords) on 12 July for his leadership. On 27 August he became commander of the V Reserve Corps and the Group Ornes, part of the front at Verdun, however from 21 November he was back with the XI Corps again. At the beginning of January 1918, he was responsible for training divisions for the planned spring offensive. In February he was deployed on the left wing of the 17th Army near Cambrai. At the end of the war he was tasked to reconnoitre eastern Belgium for defense.

=== Weimar Republic ===
After the armistice, the general command of the XI Corps relocated back to its peacetime headquarters at Kassel. Kühne tendered his resignation in July 1919 but was asked to remain in service until the dissolution of the general command. On 30 September 1919 he was retired with the character of a general of artillery.

Afterwards he resided in Berlin-Wilmersdorf and studied foreign languages and cultural history.

=== Family ===
Kühne married Maria von Eschwege (1862–1935), a great-granddaughter of Ludwig Emil Grimm, in 1882. Their daughter, Therese (1895–1961), married SS officer Herbert von Bose in 1919. By marriage, Kühne was also related to the Lejeune, Riedel, Thesing and Eschwege families.
