= Battle of Robănești =

Battle in World War I that resulted in a German victory

Battle of Robănești (Charge of Robănești)
- Part of the Battle of Slatina of the Romanian Campaign of World War I
Date	23 November 1916
Location	Robănești, Dolj County 44°17′39″N 24°00′32″E
Result	German victory

Belligerents
Romania	German Empire

Commanders and leaders
Alexandru Cӑlinescu	Paul von Kneussl

The Battle of Robănești (frequently referred to as the Charge of Robănești) is a confrontation which took place between Romanian and German troops during the Romanian Campaign of World War I.

== Background ==
On the morning of 23 October 1916, the Central Powers launched a surprise attack, with no artillery preparation. Due to their numerical superiority, they managed to conquer all the heights along the borderline by the morning of the next day. By 26 October, German forces reached the town of Târgu Jiu, but failed to cross the Jiu Bridge and take the city due to determined Romanian resistance, notably by the city's population. On 27 October, a general counter-attack of the Romanians forced the Germans to withdraw, leaving behind a significant quantity of equipment. The Romanian advance continued for the following days, one by one the German defensive lines being overrun as they began their general retreat. However, this Romanian victory could not be strategically exploited, as the Romanian forces lacked the means to pursue the enemy, both because of their exhaustion and the arrival of German reinforcements.

Following this tactical defeat, the German army regrouped. The German High Command created the Army Group Kühne headquartered in Petroșani, under the command of General Viktor Kühne. This Army Group included the 11th and 301st Bavarian infantry divisions, which had previously fought the Romanians on the Jiu, the 41st Prussian and the 109th infantry divisions which were transferred from the Riga front as well as the newly formed 58th Cavalry Corps (z.b.V) under the command of general Egon Graf von Schmettow, which included the 6th and 7th cavalry divisions. The German reserves consisted of the 115th infantry division and two brigades of cyclists. The total manpower of the Army Group amounted to 80,000 troops with 30,000 horses.

The Romanian forces could not withstand the new German attack which started on 1 November 1916. The Romanians retreated and on 21 November 1916 the German cavalry entered Craiova. The Romanian army continued its retreat towards the Olt river, having the cavalry trying to slow the German advance, to give it time to organize a defensive line along the Olt.

== Position of the troops before the battle ==
On 20 November 1916, the Romanian cavalry was stationed at Caracal. It consisted of the 2nd Roșiori Brigade and a portion of the 1st Romanian Cavalry Division, which included the 4th Roșiori regiment "Queen Maria" and the 9th Roșiori regiment. The Brigade received the mission to cover the left wing of the troops who were retreating from the Jiu towards Slatina, pursued by General von Schmettow's Cavalry. On the night of 20/21 November, squadrons of the cavalry on scouting missions came into contact with German patrols.

In the morning of 22 November 1916 the vanguard of the Brigade reaches the proximity of the village of Bojoiu. The situation of the armies is the following. The main part of the German army advances eastwards from Craiova towards Balș while the exhausted 1/17 Romanian Division is retreating through Balș towards Slatina, while trying to resist on a front from Robănești to Câmpeni. The right flank of the German army is protected by Two battalions of the 11th Bavarian Division are entrenched in a forest south of the former village of Pârșani (about 4 km west of Pielești) and are protected by heavy artillery. In this situation Defence Group Oltenia orders the 2nd Roșiori Brigade to attack the flank and the rear of the advancing German army.

== Beginning of the battle ==
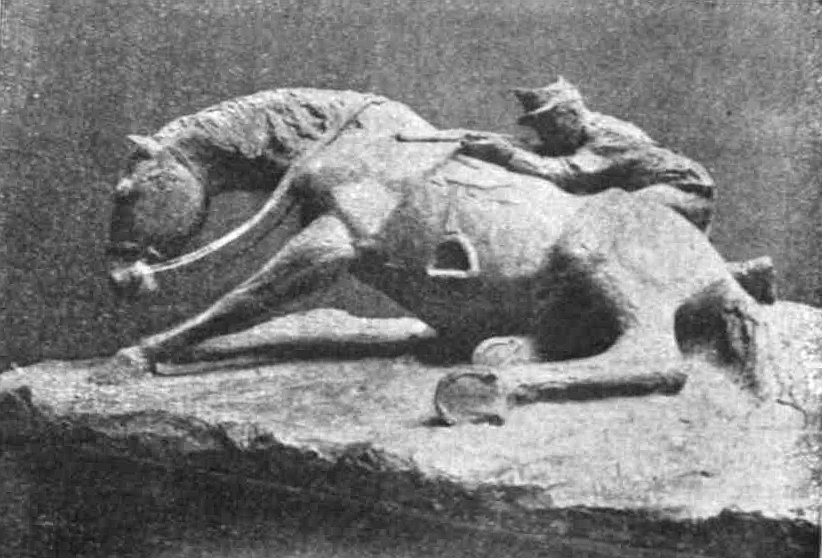
Bas-relief by Ioan Iordănescu

On 23 November 1916 at 6 a.m. under dense fog, captain Alexandru Filitti, commander of the 3rd cavalry squadron is called from Lăcrița Mare where his squadron was stationed to Popânzălești to join the main forces of the Brigade. At 7 a.m. the entire Brigade starts advancing towards Bojoiu, Robănești, and Pielești.

At 8 a.m. the Romanian vanguard, including part of the 9th Roșiori regiment and a squadron of machine guns encounters the German lines east of Bojoiu and its advance is stopped. Receiving reinforcements, the Romanian troops attack and after a strong exchange of fire the Germans retreat and the Romanians occupy the village.

In the meantime, two battalions of the 11th Bavarian Division, reinforced by machine-gun units and artillery occupied a front line from Pârșani to Robăneștii de Sus.

At 8:15 a.m. the 9th Roșiori regiment is ordered to attack the German left wing located in the village Pârșani behind the Pârșani forest. The regiment advances west of the village of Bojoiu, towards Lăcrița Mare along the valley of the Vlașca River being kept out of sight by the Robănești hills.

Shortly afterwards, at 8:30 a.m. the rest of the vanguard of the brigade continues to advance, crossing Robăneștii de Jos, advancing despite some German attacks till about 8:45 a.m. where it encounters strong enemy fire. The Romanians decide to attack the German positions. The 4th Roșiori Regiment is ordered to carry out the frontal attack and consequently dismounts. The fourth squadron takes position preparing for the attack along the Robăneștii de Jos–Pârșani road. On the right flank, three platoons of the third squadron take position covering the terrain to the Teslui River. To the left another platoon of the same squadron takes position, reinforced by the machine-gun unit. The first squadron of the regiment is kept as reserve. A unit of the horse-drawn artillery, under the command of captain Vasilescu, is also positioned on the left side.

== The charge ==
In the meantime, the 9th Roșiori regiment had stopped near some straw stacks, at about 800 meters south-west of the Pârșani forest. Lieutenant Emil Mora, who had scouted the area, reported to Colonel Călinescu that he had identified the position of the German artillery and could indicate the line along which the Romanian cavalry could charge that position. However, the Romanians had no information about the position of the other German troops. Colonel Călinescu accepted the advice and ordered his second in command to select the squadron for the charge. At this moment, captain Alexandru Filitti volunteered to lead his squadron to charge the German positions.

Having lost some of its men in previous combats, the squadron was only 110 swords strong, and all other officers besides its commander had been sent on various missions. Captain Filitti decided to have two platoons, under the command of sergeant Ion Bălașa, advance northwards, under cover of a small hill and then to attack the flank of the artillery position. Captain Filitti decides to lead himself the main charge. Lieutenant Emil Mora, who was in charge of the supplies of the regiment and lieutenant Iuliu Roșca aide-de-camp of the regiment commander volunteer to take command of one of two platoons. Another volunteer was 67-year-old sergeant Gheorghe Donici, who had participated in the Romanian War of Independence.

When the charge approached the German positions, the Germans hastily pulled back their cannons. The entire 3rd squadron continued its charge to pursue the retreating artillery. In doing this they came under the fire of the German machine guns which had been hidden behind the haystacks and the fire of the German infantry which had been hidden in trenches along the Craiova–Balș road. Captain Filitti was wounded by fire but continued his charge until his horse was killed by a hand grenade and he himself was heavily wounded and taken prisoner.

The result of the charge was the total annihilation of the 3rd squadron. Only two officers and 16 soldiers survived and were taken prisoners. The losses amounted to one officer and 94 soldiers.

== The Aftermath ==
The two remaining squadrons of the 9th Roșiori regiment try to advance to relieve the third squadron, though the action was so rapid that there was no time to intervene. From its new position, the German artillery opens fire against them and the rest of the regiment has no other way out than to retreat.

In the meantime, the attack of the 4th regiment is also engaged in heavy fighting and has significant losses. Having its left flank uncovered due to the retreat of the 9th regiment and being also under attack by the German infantry infiltrated in the gap, the 4th regiment is also obliged to withdraw.

The Romanian losses on the battle of the 4th regiment at the officers level were three killed in battle, three wounded in action (out of which two taken prisoners). The regiment's doctor was also taken prisoner. There were 58 troops killed in action, 17 wounded and 36 missing in action.

While the charge succeeded in its immediate objective of dislodging the German artillery from its position, this did not have any bearing on the general outcome of the battle which was a total German victory. However, the general objective of the Romanian cavalry had been to divert the attention of the German army from pursuing the retreating Romanian 1/17 Division, and the battle was able to provide some badly needed relief to the retreating army.

== Legacy ==
A monument commemorating the battle of Robănești was erected in 1923.
