= Teslui =

Teslui may refer to several places in Romania:

- Teslui, Dolj, a commune in Dolj County
- Teslui, Olt, a commune in Olt County
- Teslui (river), a tributary of the Olt in Dolj and Olt Counties
