= Teslui (river) =

- Location within Romania

Location
- Country: Romania
- Counties: Dolj, Olt
- Villages: Gruița, Pielești, Teslui, Dobrosloveni, Fărcașele

Physical characteristics
- Mouth: Olt
  - coordinates: 44.1402°N 24.4639°E
- Length: 110 km (68 mi)
- Basin size: 569 km^{2} (220 sq mi)

Basin features
- Progression: Olt→ Danube→ Black Sea
- Tributaries
  - left: Lânga, Scheaua, Potopin
  - right: Vlașca, Brâncoveanca, Frăsinet

The Teslui is a right tributary of the river Olt in Romania. It discharges into the Olt in Fărcașele. Its length is 110 km (68 mi) and its basin size is 569 km^{2} (220 sq mi).
