= Paul von Kneussl =

Paul von Kneußl
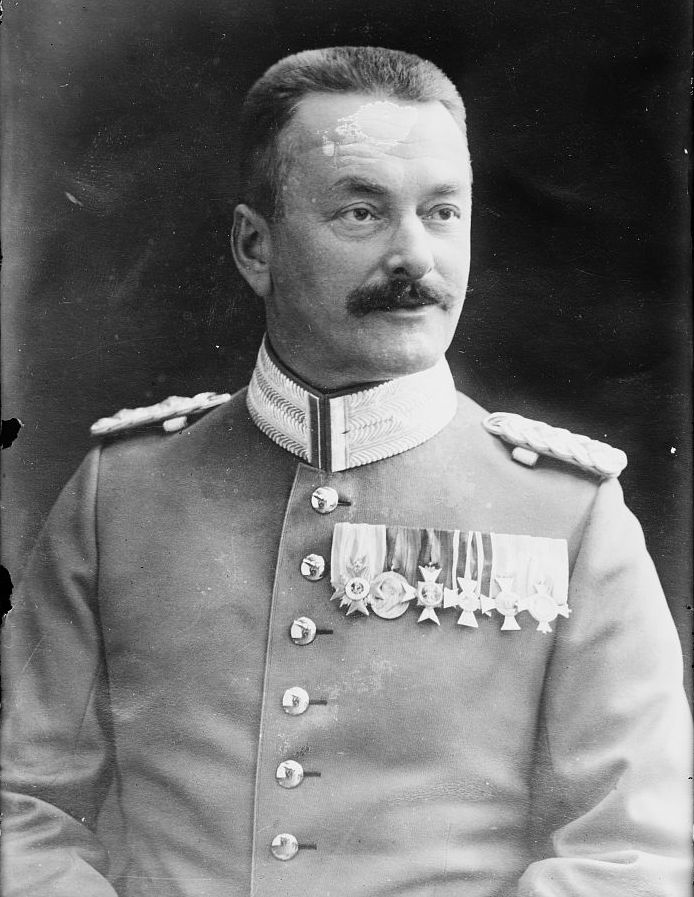
- Born: June 27, 1862; Lindau, Kingdom of Bavaria
- Died: February 16, 1928 (aged 65); Munich, Bavaria, Germany
- Military career
- Allegiance: Kingdom of Bavaria; German Empire
- Branch: Bavarian Army; Imperial German Army
- Service years: 1880 – 1919
- Rank: General of the Infantry
- Commands: 11th Bavarian Infantry Division; XV Royal Bavarian Reserve Corps
- Conflicts: World War I: Siege of Przemyśl; First Battle of the Jiu Valley; Battle of Robănești; Battle of Kowel; Battle of the Argeș
- Awards: Pour le Mérite with oak leaves Military Order of Max Joseph

Paul von Kneußl, since 1913 Ritter von Kneußl, was a German general. He was most notable for his service in the Romanian Campaign of World War I.

== Biography ==
Paul was born in Lindau as the son of the district administrator Johann Baptist Kneussl and his wife Klara, née Vigl.

After graduating from a trade school he went to a two-year technical college and entered the Bavarian Army in 1880 as a One-year volunteer in the 4th Field Artillery Regiment. He was then taken over as a Kapitulant in the 3rd Infantry Regiment and appointed as an ensign. On December 22, 1883, he was promoted, prematurely on highest commendations, to Second Lieutenant.

As a premier lieutenant (since June 13, 1892) he became regimental adjutant in 1889 and studied at the war academy from 1892 to 1895; which attested him qualifications for the general staff, the higher adjutantage and the academic teaching of tactics. Following this Kneußl was promoted to captain and became a company commander in the 2nd Jäger Battalion on March 17, 1897. In 1899 he was transferred to the staff of the II Royal Bavarian Corps and in 1900 to the III Royal Bavarian Corps. He was promoted to major on September 21, 1904 and on October 17, 1905 he was appointed a battalion commander in the Royal Bavarian Infantry Lifeguards Regiment. On December 12, 1906, he was transferred to the Central Staff of the General Staff, and was promoted to Lieutenant Colonel on September 11, 1907. On December 30, 1907, Kneußl was appointed director of the Bavarian War Academy for two years and on December 19, 1909 he was appointed Chief of Staff of the III Corps in Nuremberg. After his promotion to colonel he took over the 3rd Infantry Regiment on October 15, 1910. At the beginning of 1912 he was transferred to the War Ministry as a department head and simultaneously was named an Ordinary Council of State.

After his promotion to major general on January 23, 1913, Kneußl received the Knight's Cross of the Order of Merit of the Bavarian Crown from the hands of his king. Associated with this was the elevation into the personal nobility and from this point on he was allowed to call himself "Ritter von Kneußl".

He took over the 8th Infantry Brigade in Metz and at the outbreak of the First World War he was given command of the 1st Reserve Infantry Brigade, with which he was deployed in northern France. Then, from March 25, 1915, Kneußl was entrusted with the leadership of the newly established 11th Bavarian Infantry Division and promoted to Lieutenant General on May 19, 1915. At the beginning of June 1915, the 11th Division played a key role in the Siege of Przemyśl. For this achievement General Kneußl, together with Austro-Hungarian General Hugo Martiny von Malastów, was awarded the Order of the Iron Crown (1st class with war decoration).

From March to May 1916 his division was used in the Battle of Verdun, then between July and October 1916 in the Brusilov Offensive in the Kovel area. Kneussl's troops proved themselves in the mountain warfare of the Romanian theater of war and during the advance on Bucharest participated in the Battle of the Argeș. In April 1917, Kneussl's division fought in the defense against French attacks in the Second Battle of the Aisne and was then in the final phase of the Battle of Passchendaele. Still standing in Flanders during the last year of the war, his troops were involved in the attack on Kemmelberg in April 1918. Shortly before the end of the war, in August, he was appointed commanding general of the XV Royal Bavarian Reserve Corps, which he returned to the homeland after the Armistice of 11 November 1918.

Kneussl was retired from the army on August 18, 1919 while at the same time being promoted to General of the Infantry.

The University of Erlangen awarded him an honorary doctorate on May 20, 1925. In 1937 a Wehrmacht barracks in Augsburg was named after him, the General Kneussl or New Infantry Barracks.

=== Awards ===
- Order of Saint Michael
- Iron Cross, 2nd and 1st class (1914)
- Pour le Mérite with oak leaves
  - Pour le Mérite on June 3, 1915
  - Oak leaves on January 11, 1917
- Order of the Red Eagle, II class with swords on June 12, 1915
- Military Order of Max Joseph
  - Knight's Cross (June 3, 1915)
  - Commander's Cross (October 8, 1915)
- Military Merit Order 2nd class with crown and swords (August 4, 1918)
- Friedrich Order, First class (April 5, 1917)
