= Battle of Slatina =

World War I battle

- Part of the Romanian Debacle of the Romanian Campaign of World War I
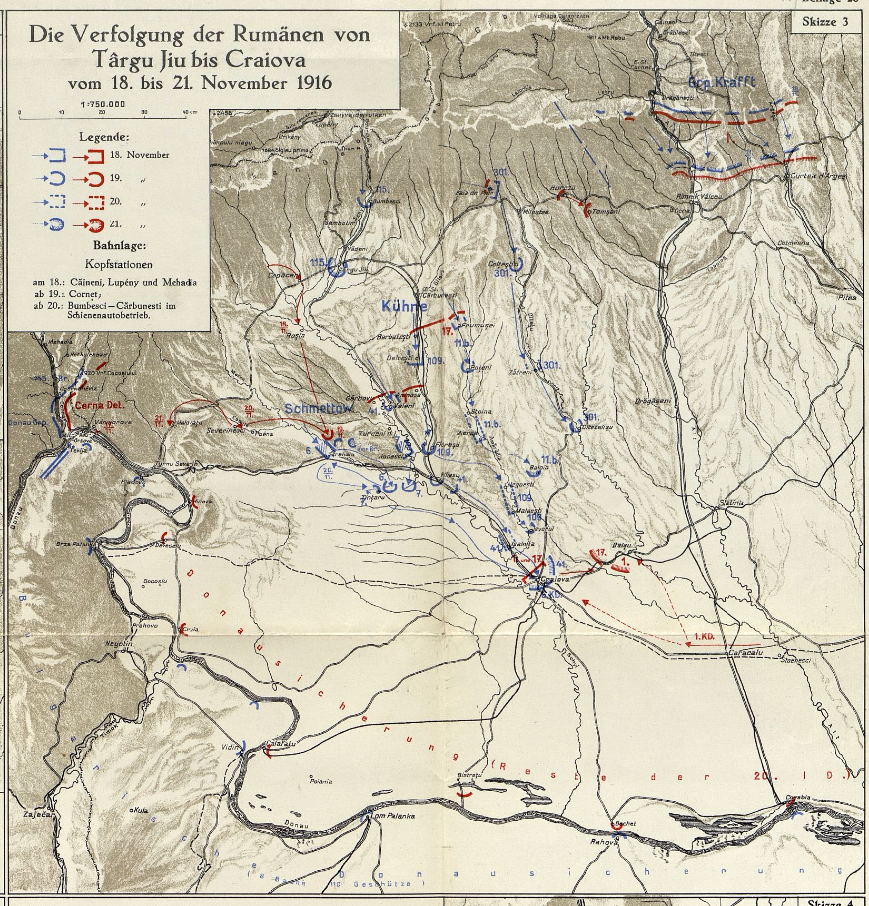
- Map of the operations in Oltenia (Romanian defenses west of the Olt marked with short thick red lines, towards the South-East of the map)
Date	23–27 November 1916
Location	Slatina and surrounding area, Romania
Result	Romanian strategic victory

Belligerents
Romania	German Empire

Commanders and leaders
(Kingdom of Romania) General Constantin Prezan (Kingdom of Romania) Captain Ion Antonescu	(German Empire) General Viktor Kühne

Units involved
1st Army (elements)	41st Division; 109th Division; 11th Bavarian Division

Casualties and losses
Unknown	Unknown

The Battle of Slatina was a military engagement between Romanian and German forces during World War I. It resulted in a strategic victory for the Romanians.

== Background ==
The Kingdom of Romania joined the Triple Entente in August 1916, following the signing of the Treaty of Bucharest, and declared war on Austria-Hungary on 27 August. In the aftermath a Romanian offensive into Transylvania that was stopped mainly by the German 9th Army under the command of Erich von Falkenhayn, the Central Powers began attempting to force the mountain passes in the Carpathians.

After failing to break the Romanian defenses in northern Oltenia during the First Battle of the Jiu Valley in late October, the Germans had by 11 November amassed a force which outnumbered the Romanians in the region more than 2 to 1 (40 infantry battalions supported by cavalry against 18 Romanian battalions), commanded by General Victor Kühne. This force finally achieved a breakthrough into Wallachia by 17 November, during the Second Battle of the Jiu Valley. Filiași fell to the Germans on 19 November, followed by Craiova on the 21st. Only parts of the Romanian 1st Army took part in the defence of Slatina; for instance, one division under Colonel Anastasiu was left at Orșova.

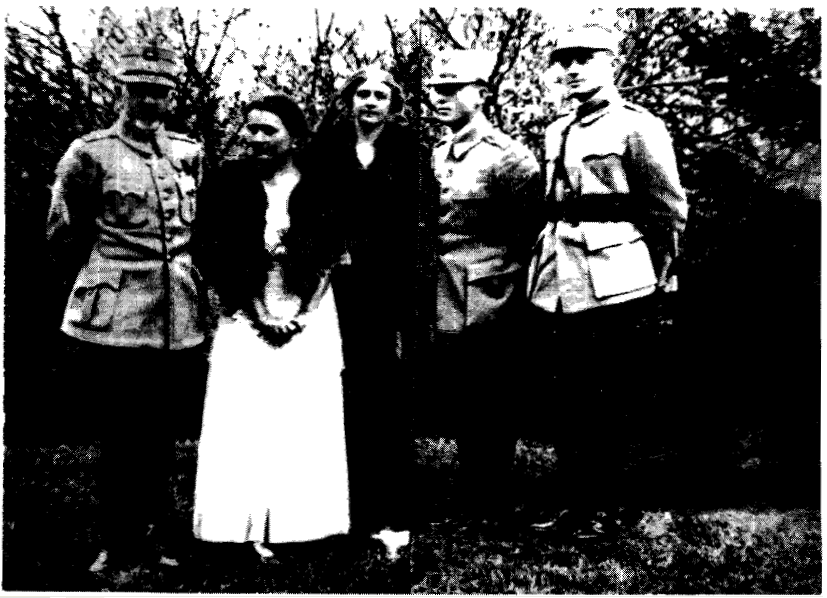
General Constantin Prezan (left) with Ion Antonescu (second from right) in 1916

On 22 November, General Constantin Prezan and his talented operations officer, Captain Ion Antonescu, were assigned to the command of the battered 1st Romanian Army, which was tasked with defending the line of the Olt River. Prezan and Antonescu arrived at the 1st Army headquarters at Pitești on the morning of 23 November, where they discovered that the situation had already changed completely: the Germans had already crossed both the Olt and the Danube rivers. Prezan was widely regarded as more of a courtier than a serious army officer. Fortunately for the Romanians, his operations officer was Captain Antonescu, "a talented if prickly individual". Such was the influence of Captain Antonescu that, in his memoirs, General Alexandru Averescu used the formula "Prezan (Antonescu)" to denote Prezan's plans and actions.

== Battle ==
On 23 November, General Kühne attacked the center of the Romanian defenses on the Olt River. His 41st and 109th Divisions tried to converge on Slatina and its bridge, but bad roads forced them to remain on the same road, one behind the other. The Bavarian 11th Division soon joined the column. The 41st Division led the way, against a hard fight which was being put up by the Romanians. The Germans were brought to a halt 12 miles west of the Olt. The Charge of Robănești took place during this battle, when the 3rd Squadron of the 7th Romanian Cavalry Regiment charged the Bavarian infantry on horseback and was wiped out to the last man. Kühne referred to this episode as "madness". On that same day, however, the German 6th Cavalry Division crossed the southern Olt at Stoenești, near Caracal. Thus, while Kühne's attack on the Romanian center had failed, German Cavalry under Eberhard Graf von Schmettow advanced from the south and turned the Romanian left flank while Konrad Krafft von Dellmensingen's forces threatened the Romanian right flank in the north, south of the Turnu Roșu Pass. In these conditions, the Romanian troops abandoned the Olt line by 27 November, not a moment too soon. Before retreating, the Romanians had blown up Slatina's railway bridge and granaries. On that same day (27 November), Kühne's infantry, after "terrific efforts", finally crossed the Olt at Slatina.

== Aftermath ==
Kühne's attack on the Romanian center at Slatina failed, the Romanian units retreating only because their flanks were threatened by other German forces. The Romanians won a strategic victory because Kühne's forces were prevented from joining the left flank of August von Mackensen's Danube Army, which had crossed the river on 23 November. On 30 November, Kühne's troops were still 50 miles away from the left flank of the Danube Army. It was this exposed left flank of Mackensen's Army that was subjected to a very heavy Romanian attack on the very next day, 1 December, starting the Battle of the Argeș. The Romanian attack on 1 December put von Mackensen's forces in a situation which was – in the words of Erich Ludendorff – "certainly very critical".
