= Frasinu River =

Frasinu River may refer to:

- Frasinu, a tributary of the Bistrița in Gorj County
- Frasinu, a tributary of the Cracăul Alb in Neamț County
- Valea Frasinului, a tributary of the Dâmbovița in Argeș County
- Frasinu, a tributary of the Lotrioara in Sibiu County

== See also ==
- Frasinu (disambiguation)
- Frasin River (disambiguation)
- Frăsinet River (disambiguation)
