= Potopin =

- Location within Romania

Location
- Country: Romania
- Counties: Olt County
- Villages: Potopinu

Physical characteristics
- Mouth: Teslui
  - location: Reșcuța
  - coordinates: 44.1726°N 24.4024°E
- Length: 23 km (14 mi)
- Basin size: 43 km^{2} (17 sq mi)

Basin features
- Progression: Teslui→ Olt→ Danube→ Black Sea
- River code: VIII.1.175.6

The Potopin is a left tributary of the river Teslui in Romania. It flows into the Teslui in Reșcuța. Its length is 23 km (14 mi) and its basin size is 43 km^{2} (17 sq mi).
