= Battle of Râmnicu Sărat =

1916 battle of World War I

- Part of the Romanian Debacle of World War I
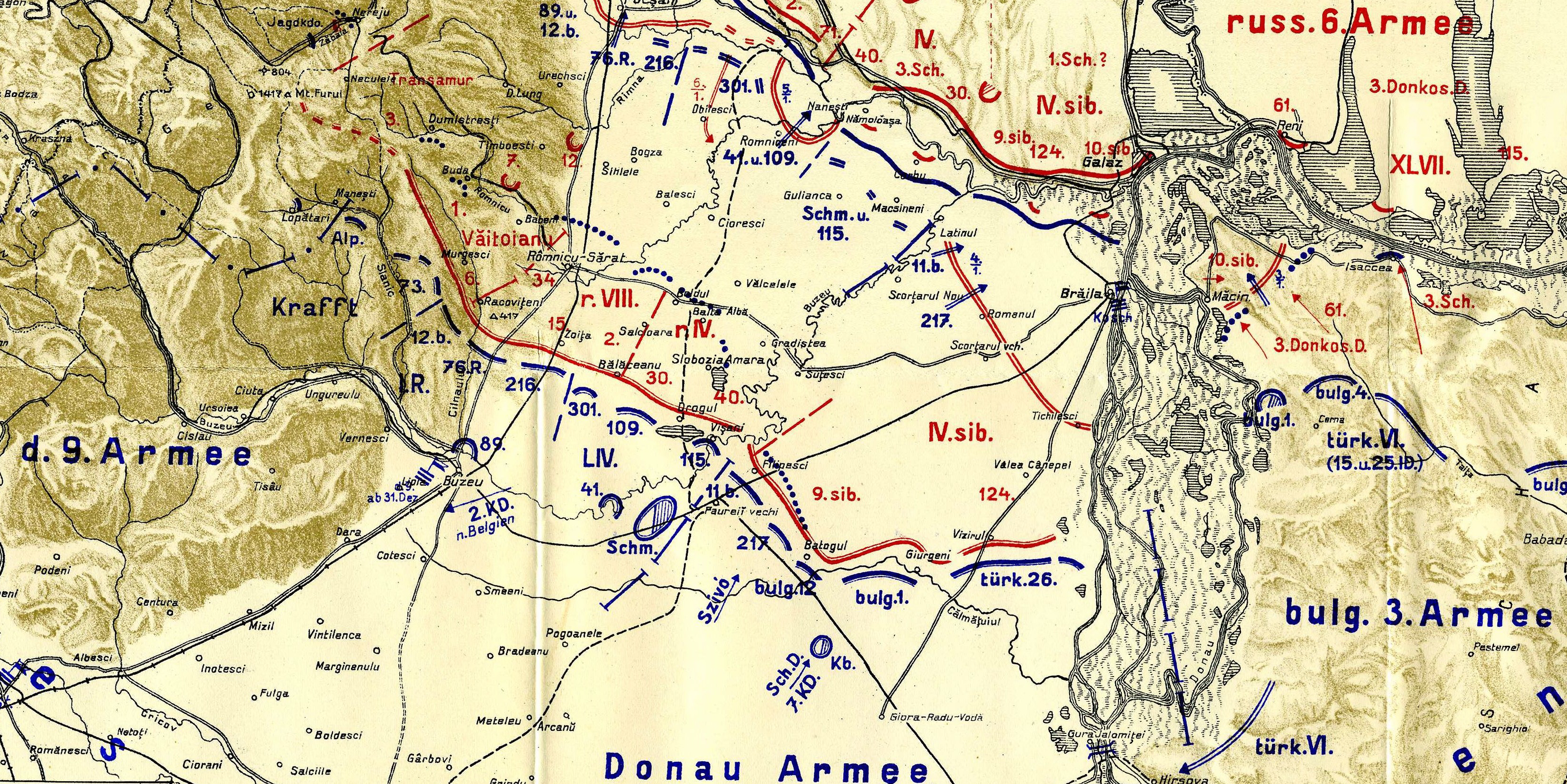
- Battle of Râmnicu Sărat
Date	22 December – 27 December 1916
Location	Râmnicu Sărat, Romania
Result	Central Powers victory

Belligerents
Central Powers: Germany; Bulgaria; Ottoman Empire	Allied Powers: Romania; Russia

Commanders and leaders
Curt von Morgen; Viktor Kühne	Alexandru Averescu; Alexander Ragoza

Casualties and losses
Unknown	10,000 soldiers

The Battle of Râmnicu Sărat (also known as the Christmas Battle of Râmnicu Sărat) was a battle fought on the Romanian Campaign during World War I. It took place from December 22 to 27, 1916, in Buzău County (the Buzău Bend) in the Wallachia region of eastern Romania and resulted in the defeat of the Russo-Romanian forces by the Central Powers.

Romania's capital, Bucharest, had already been occupied by German troops since December 6, 1916, as a consequence of the Battle of Argeş. New resistance by Romanian forces along the Cricov, Urziceni, Prahova, and Ialomița was broken by the Central Powers in mid-December. After the defeat in the Râmnicu Sărat area, Russo-Romanian forces were forced to continue their general retreat to the border of the Moldavian region.

== Background ==
The Romanian declaration of war on Austria-Hungary on August 27, 1916, was preceded by secret negotiations with the Russian Empire. In these negotiations, the Tsarist Empire accepted Romanian territorial claims to Bukovina, Transylvania, and the Banat. With Romania's accession to the Triple Entente and the invasion of Transylvania by the Romanian army, the Central Powers were forced to open another front.

The Romanian army advanced into Transylvania, then part of the Kingdom of Hungary. However, the Romanians were defeated by the German 9th Army in the Battle of Sibiu (September 22–29). The army, under the command of the former Chief of the Supreme Army Command (OHL), Erich von Falkenhayn, was repulsed. In a large-scale urban warfare—rather atypical for the First World War—Brașov (Kronstadt) was recaptured by October 8. In mid-November, the Viktor Kühne Group (General Command 54), in conjunction with the Eberhard von Schmettow Cavalry Corps, broke through south into Wallachia near Târgu Jiu and occupied Craiova.

Furthermore, on November 23 and 24, 1916, Mackensen's crossing of the Danube near Sistowa, on their southern border, took place—a completely unexpected event for the Romanians.

With the help of Austrian pioneer forces, the newly formed Danube Army (General Command 52) under General Robert Kosch with the 217th Infantry Division, the combined cavalry division (General Hans von der Goltz) and the Bulgarian 1st and 12th Divisions was brought across the river. As early as November 25, the Central Powers' troops were assembled in the northern bridgehead on the Romanian-Bulgarian border near Zimnicea, with the Turkish 26th Division, which had been brought up behind, serving as a reserve. The Danube Army crossed the Teleormanu River on November 26 and began its advance on Bucharest.

The Romanian High Command had deployed most of its troops under General Alexandru Averescu assembled his forces in the northern sector near the Carpathian Mountains, thus exposing Romania's unprotected Danube frontier. The resulting Central Powers numerical superiority in the Danube Army sector amounted to 40 German and Bulgarian battalions and 188 guns compared to the Romanian Danube Group's 18 battalions and 48 guns.

Involving the allied Russian 6th Army, the Romanians in the south, under General Constantin Prezan, began preparing a counterattack to avoid the encirclement of Bucharest. The plan was to attack the advancing Central Powers on both exposed flanks of Bucharest's southern and western approaches along the Argeș River before Bucharest could be surrounded. The Russian commander-in-chief in Romania, General Vladimir Sakharov, did not agree to the attack plan, but promised to expedite the deployment of the 47th Corps to protect Bucharest and thus strengthen the Romanian defenses in the south.

== Battle ==
The Battle of Râmnicu Sărat was part of the defensive operation in the territory of Greater Wallachia (Muntenia), the fourth strategic operation of the Romanian army in the 1916 campaign. Following the Battle of Argeș (Battle of Bucharest), which ended in a victory for the Central Powers, the objective of the Romanian command was to delay the enemy's advance through offensive actions in order to gain time to concentrate Russian troops on the line Râmnicu Sărat–Viziru–Danube.

After the unsuccessful attempt at the Cricov–River line To hold Ialomița, the Romanian forces were forced to continue their retreat in the Buzău River sector. The new Romanian-Russian position in the central sector of the front stretched from the heights near Racovitenti via Balaceanul to Filipesti and then followed the course of the Calmatuiu River.

The forces consisted of the Second Army under the command of General Alexandru Averescu, who transported his heavy military equipment from the Slănic River to Racovițeni (Buzău County), where he joined the Russian 4th Army under General of Infantry Alexander Ragoza.

The army was under the command of General Alexandru Averescu, who moved his heavy military equipment from the Slănic River to Racovițeni (Buzău County), where it linked up with the Russian 4th Army under General of Infantry Alexander Ragoza.

The army was under the command of General Alexandru Averescu, who moved its heavy military equipment from the Slănic River to Racovițeni. The 34th Infantry Division (Lieutenant General Nikolai Petrovich Stremukhov) of the Russian VIII Army Corps secured the important heights near Racovițeni. Opposite the Danube Army (General Kosch) and the Bulgarian 3rd Army (General Stefan Nerezov) was the Russian 6th Army, commanded by General Vladimir Nikolayevich Gorbatovsky.

The forces of the Romanian 2nd Army were divided into two operational groups: facing the Austro-Hungarian forces. The armed forces secured the "Oituz-Vrancea Group" in the mountains and, opposite the German Alpine Corps (Krafft Group), the "Ramnic Group."

- The Oituz-Vrancea Group was located in the Slănicului/Zăbalei Valley, with the 15th Infantry Division (General Eremia Grigorescu) positioned between Tandor Peak and Clăbucul Peak, and the 7th Mixed Brigade (Colonel Alexandru D. Sturdza) from Clăbucul Peak to Furu Peak.
- The Ramnic Group (General Arthur Văitoianu) with the 3rd Infantry Division (Colonel Alexandru Mărgineanu) secured the area around the village of Măgura and Marghiloman Hill, with detachments at Nereju, Furu Mare and Petrei Peak; the 1st Infantry Division (General Dumitru Stratilescu) was located in the Marghiloman Hill sector, Salciei Valley and Pardoși; the 6th Infantry Division (General Nicolae Arghirescu) was located in the Pardoși-Racovițeni sector, where the Russians joined. The Trans-Caspian Cossack Brigade acted as a reserve behind it as well as the Romanian 7th Infantry Division (Colonel Grigore Bunescu) and 12th Infantry Division (General Traian Găiseanu).

The Russian VIII Army Corps under Lieutenant General Anton Ivanovich Denikin (2nd, 15th, and 34th Divisions) secured the area adjacent to the Romanian Ramnic Group. On the left flank, General Ragosa had deployed the IV Army Corps under General Sultan Eris Aliyev (30th and 40th Infantry Divisions) along the line Balaceanul via Drogul to the Buzau River.

On December 22, the German 9th Army, commanded by Erich von Falkenhayn, launched its attack. The aim was to reach the Buzău-Focșani railway, with the Group Krafft on the left wing against the mountainous region of Dumistresti and the group Morgen on the right. The group Krafft made no progress on the left flank, and the Austro-Hungarian 73rd Division (Lieutenant Field Marshal Ludwig Goiginger) was also held back by Ramnic's group.

The following day, Kühne's group (LIV Corps) on the right flank made no further progress. The 109th Infantry Division broke through the enemy lines at Galbenul; subsequently, the entire Russian line from the lake near Drogul to Balaceanul fell. On December 24, the left flank of the German I Reserve Corps (Morgen Group) achieved a breakthrough. The 89th Infantry Division, together with the Bavarian 12th Infantry Division, was able to break through the enemy lines. 12th Infantry Division stormed the commanding "Hill 417" near Racovițeni. The left wing of the Danube Army had not yet participated in the battle, as the command feared flanking attacks from the Siberian IV Army Corps on the western bank of the Buzau River. It was only on December 25th that the Bavarian 11th Royal Bavarian Division attacked near Filipesti, and two days later the Bulgarian 1st Division unsuccessfully attempted to break through near Giurgeni.

After the advance of Kühne's group continued to stall, General von Falkenhayn committed his last reserve, the 41st Division German Empire, to the battle on December 25th. On December 27th, the 76th Reserve Division was able to. The Reserve Division penetrated Râmnicu Sărat, while to its left, the Bavarian 12th and 89th Infantry Divisions advanced north of the town. South of this, the 216th Infantry Division was also pushed forward. Kühne's group was now able to break through the positions of the Russian IV Corps and advanced northeast along the Grădiștea-Râmnicu Sărat road.

The following news item was published in the Allgemeine Zeitung at the beginning of 1917:

The movements on the Romanian battlefields are marked by victory; in the Battle of Râmnicu Sărat in the Buzău Bend, Falkenhayn and Mackensen operated with ingenious tactical skill, constantly threatening the enemy in Wallachia and Dobruja on the flanks, making excellent use of the Danube's bends.

— Allgemeine Zeitung, Bayerische Druckerei und Verlagsanstalt, 1917, p. 20.

== Aftermath ==
In the battles at In Râmnicu Sărat, over 10,000 soldiers died in a days-long massacre on the small plateau of "Hill 417" during the Christmas holidays of 1916. Another 10,000 men were taken prisoner, and the town of Râmnicu Sărat itself was occupied.

Among the participants in the battle was the future deputy Adolf Hitler, Rudolf Hess. When he arrived at his unit in Romania, the remnants of the Romanian army had assembled at Râmnicu Sărat for a decisive battle that would last until January 8, 1917.

== Sources ==
- Kurt Jagow: "Data of the World War: Background and Course until the End of 1921." K. F. Koehler Publishing House, Leipzig 1922.
- Rudolf Kiszling: "The Campaign in Transylvania," from: "Austria-Hungary's Last War 1914–1918: Volume V," Verlag der Militärwissenschaftlichen Mitteilungen, Vienna 1930, pp. 250–260 and 298–299.
- Max Everwien: "Christmas Battle at Ramnicul-Sarat," in: "Heavy Artillery Fights, Laughs, Dies." Leuchtkugel-Verlag, Berlin 1933, p. 163.
- Verlag der Militärwissenschaftlichen Mitteilungen (ed.): "Military Science Reports." Volume 70, Editor: Emil Ratzenhofer, 1939, p. 443.
