= Ghimpați (disambiguation) =

Ghimpați may refer to several places in Romania:

- Ghimpați, a commune in Giurgiu County
- Ghimpați, a village in Răcari town, Dâmbovița County
- Ghimpați, a village in Fărcașele Commune, Olt County
- Ghimpați, a former village in Valea Dragului Commune, Giurgiu County
- Ghimpați, a former village, now part of Poiana village, Ciulnița Commune, Ialomița County
