= Frăsinet =

Frăsinet or Frăsinetu may refer to several places in Romania:

- Frăsinet, Călărași, a commune in Călăraşi County
- Frăsinet, Teleorman, a commune in Teleorman County
- Frăsinet, a village in Calvini Commune, Buzău County
- Frăsinet, a village in Băișoara Commune, Cluj County
- Frăsinet, a village in Breaza town, Prahova County
- Scrind-Frăsinet, a village in Mărgău Commune, Cluj County
- Frăsinet (river), a river in Olt County
- Frăsinetu, a village in Dobrosloveni Commune, Olt County
- Frăsinetu de Jos, a village in Frăsinet Commune, Călărași County

== See also ==
- Frasin (disambiguation)
- Frasinu (disambiguation)
