= Predești =

- Commune
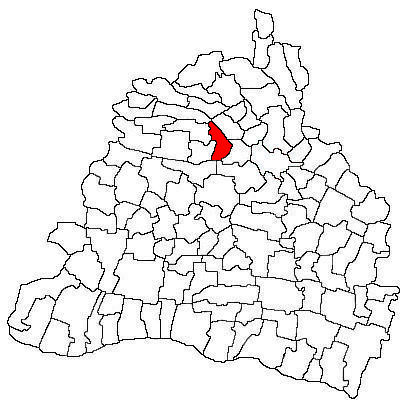
- Location in Dolj County

- Location in Romania
- Coordinates: 44°22′N 23°36′E
- Country: Romania
- County: Dolj
- Area: 43.51 km^{2} (16.80 sq mi)
- Population (2021-12-01): 1,770
  - Density: 40.7/km^{2} (105/sq mi)
- Time zone: UTC+02:00 (EET)
  - Summer (DST): UTC+03:00 (EEST)
- Vehicle reg.: DJ

Predești is a commune in Dolj County, Oltenia, Romania with a population of 3,405. It is composed of three villages: Bucicani, Predești and Predeștii Mici. It included four other villages until 2004, when they were split off to form Pleșoi Commune.
