= Vlașca (river) =

- Location within Romania

Location
- Country: Romania
- Counties: Dolj County

Physical characteristics
- Mouth: Teslui
  - coordinates: 44.2759°N 24.0708°E
  - elevation: 128 m (420 ft)
- Length: 15 km (9.3 mi)
- Basin size: 60 km^{2} (23 sq mi)

Basin features
- Progression: Teslui→ Olt→ Danube→ Black Sea
- Tributaries
  - right: Valea Viilor

The Vlașca is a right tributary of the river Teslui in Romania. It discharges into the Teslui in Popânzălești. Its length is 15 km (9.3 mi) and its basin size is 60 km^{2} (23 sq mi).
