= Frasinu =

Frasinu may refer to:

- Frasinu, a village in Cornești, Dâmbovița, Romania
- Frasinu, a village in Băneasa, Giurgiu, Romania
- Frasinu, a village in Poienești Commune, Vaslui County, Romania

== See also ==
- Frasinu River (disambiguation)
- Frasin (disambiguation)
- Frăsinet (disambiguation)
