= Frasin (disambiguation) =

Frasin may refer to:

== Romania ==
- Frasin, a town in Suceava County
- Frasin, a village in Pleșoi Commune, Dolj County
- Frasin, a village in Vladimir Commune, Gorj County
- Frasin, a village administered by Broșteni town, Suceava County
- Frasin-Deal and Frasin-Vale, villages in Cobia Commune, Dâmbovița County
- Frasin, a tributary of the Bistricioara in Neamț County
- Frasin, a tributary of the Bistra in Neamț County
- Frasin (Jijia), a tributary of the Jijia in Iași County
- Frasin, a tributary of the Șușița in Gorj County
- Frasin, a tributary of the Tazlăul Sărat in Bacău County

== Moldova ==
- Frasin, Dondușeni, a commune in Donduşeni district
- Frasin, a village in Ivanovca Commune, Hîncești district

== See also ==
- Frasinu (disambiguation)
- Frăsinet (disambiguation)
- Frăsiniș
