= Battle of Bucharest =

1916 battle in Bucharest, Romania

- Part of the Romanian Debacle of the Romanian Campaign of World War I
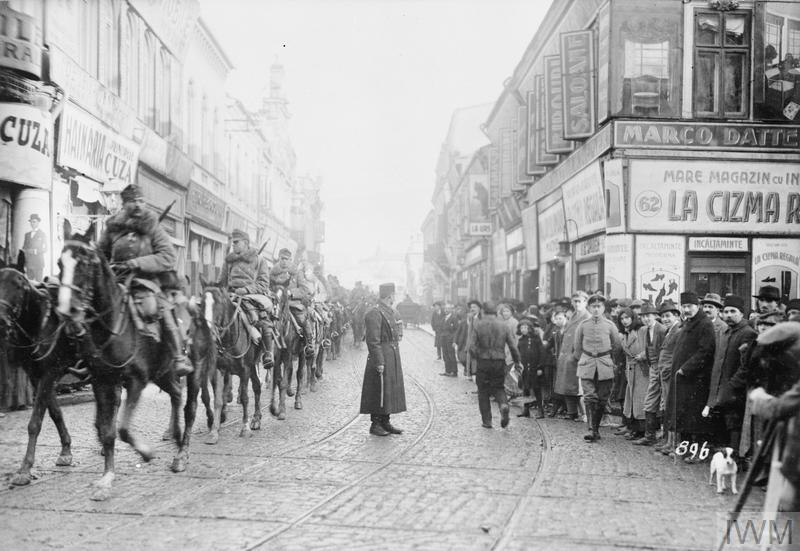
- Austro-Hungarian cavalry entering Bucharest on 6 December 1916
Date	29 November – 6 December 1916
Location	Bucharest, Romania
Result	Central Powers victory
Territorial changes	Central Powers occupation of Bucharest

Belligerents
Romania; Russian Empire	German Empire; Bulgaria; Ottoman Empire; Austria-Hungary

Commanders and leaders
(Kingdom of Romania) Constantin Prezan	(German Empire) Erich von Falkenhayn (German Empire) August von Mackensen

Strength
150,000	250,000

Casualties and losses
60,000 soldiers killed, wounded and missing 85 artillery pieces 115 machine guns	10,000 soldiers

The Battle of Bucharest, also known as the Argeş–Neajlov Defensive Operation in Romania, was the last battle of the Romanian Campaign of 1916 in World War I, in which the Central Powers' combatants, led by General Erich von Falkenhayn, occupied the Romanian capital and forced the Romanian Government, as well as the remnants of the Romanian Army to retreat to Moldavia and re-establish its capital at Iaşi.

The battle was of defensive nature, as the Romanian Army was joined by a part of the Imperial Russian army. The Romanian Army, led by General Constantin Prezan, had previously been unable to stop the German counterattack in Muntenia. The forces comprising the German counterattack were largely German; two groups attacked in concentric fashion, one from Oltenia and the other from south of the Danube. The sheer number of troops involved, as well as the large area of operations, make it one of the most complex battles fought on Romanian soil during the war.

On 29 November 1916, Pitești was taken by the Central Powers. On 4 December, the Danube Army, under general field marshal August von Mackensen's command – consisting of German, Bulgarian, Ottoman, and Austro-Hungarian troops – won the battle of Argeș. As a result, Bucharest and Ploiești were occupied on 6 December by the Central Powers On 11 December 1916, German and Austro-Hungarian troops crossed the Ialomița river. During the night of 14–15 December, the Romanian forces retreated from Wallachia to Moldavia., marking a new moment in the war.

== Background ==
On 27 November 1916, three main events took place which enabled the Central Powers to commence the offensive towards Bucharest: following a successful holding action at Slatina, the Romanians abandoned the line of the Olt River, the German 9th Army and Mackensen's Danube Army had linked up, and the Danube had been secured by the Bulgarian capture of Giurgiu.

== Commanders ==
The Romanian and Russian forces, made up of approximately 150.000 men, were led by General Constantin Prezan, while the Central Powers' armed forces were led by General August von Mackensen and Erich von Falkenhayn.

Following a series of losses by the Romanian Army in Oltenia and Muntenia, the political authorities appointed General Constantin Prezan commander of Army 1, with the immediate objective of organizing the defense of Bucharest. "Through a Supreme Order you are temporarily named commander of Army 1. As such, we ask of you report tomorrow, 10 November, at 10:30 A.M. at the General Quarters. You shall take Captain Antonescu Ion with you from the North Army."

== The strategy ==
In spite of the disastrous strategic situation that he was presented with, Prezan, alongside of the leader of the newly arrived French military mission to Romania, General Henri Berthelot, devised a plan of operations that involved a surprise flanking maneuver at the division between Mackensen's armed forces and Kühne's. That division referred to a 20-kilometer area between the two groups of German combatants.

Prezan ordered a concentrated attack made up of seven divisions against Mackensen's group. Divisions 18 and 21 attacked frontally to pin the German forces down, while Divisions 2/5, 9/19 Infantry and Division 2 Cavalry attacked the exposed left flank of Mackensen's group. At the same time, two newly arrived Russian divisions, Cavalry 8 and Infantry 40 attacked the left flank.

== The battle ==
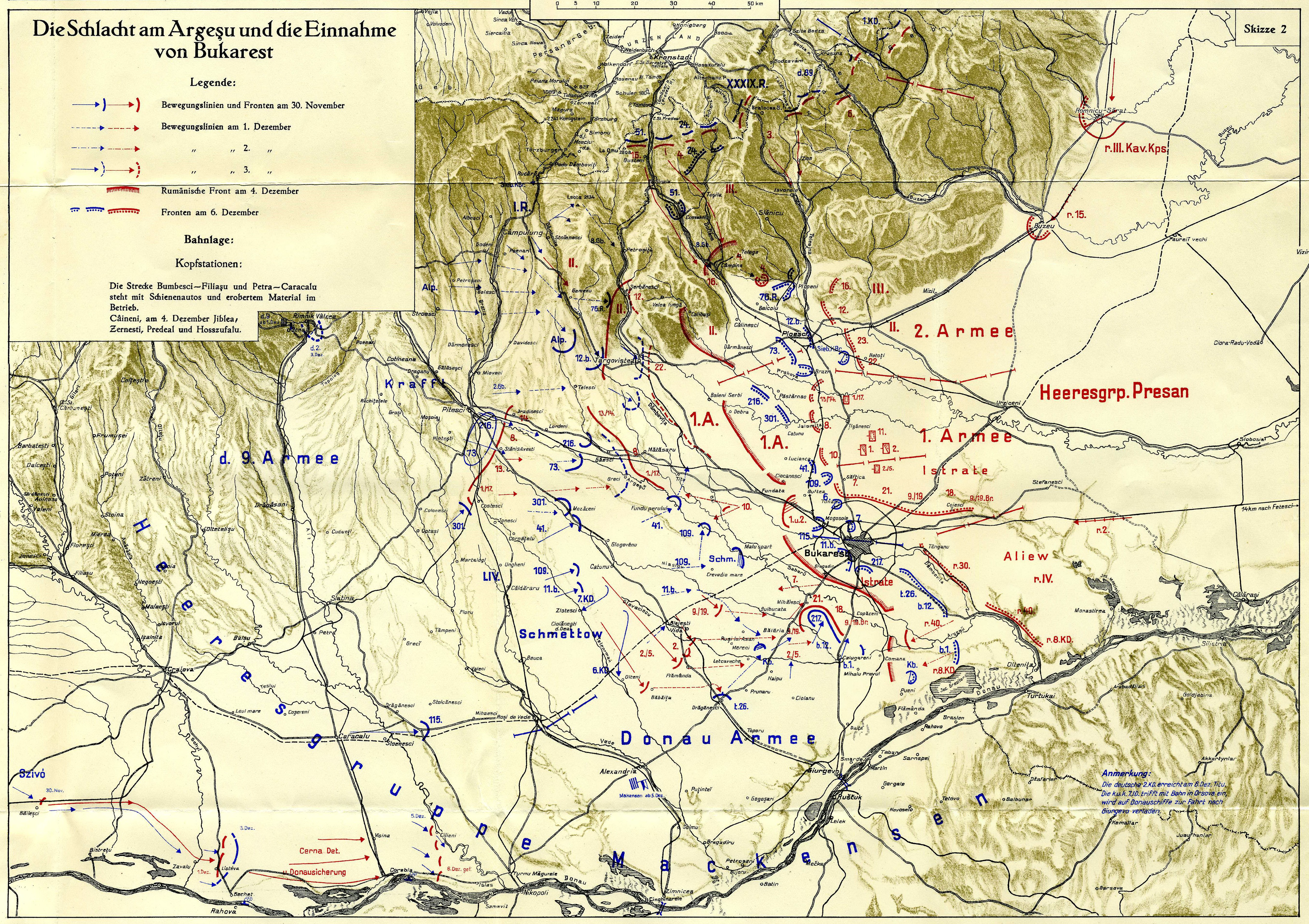
The conduct of military actions

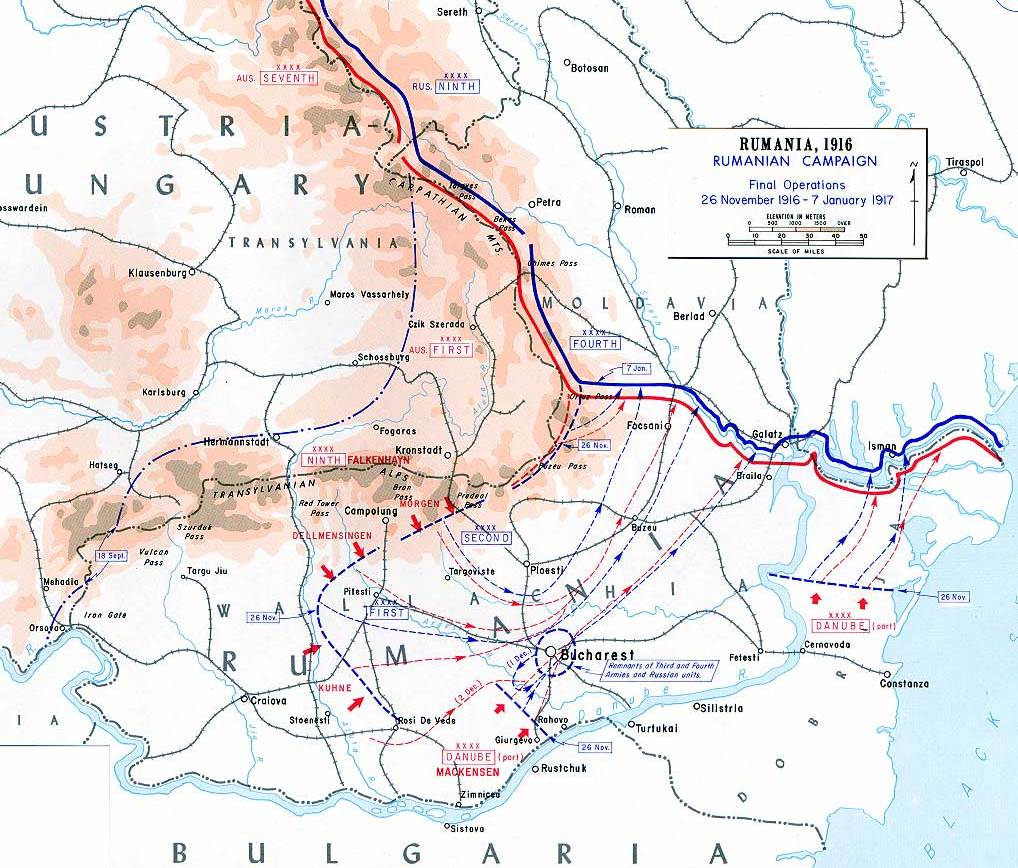
Operations in Romania, November 1916 to January 1917

=== Prelude (28–30 November) ===
On 28 November, the German 217th Division was halted at Prunaru, despite the Romanians incurring casualties amounting to 700 prisoners and 20 guns. Although the 217th moved some battalions to Naipu, these were checked by Prezan's maneuver group within two days. The left flank of the Danube Army had thus been exposed. On 29 November, the towns of Pitești and Câmpulung fell to the Germans, after the Romanian 1st Army made a brief stand at Pitești.

=== Battle of the Argeș and its aftermath ===
On 1 December, the Romanian Army began its attack, striking the 20 km wide gap between the Mackensen and Falkenhayn groups, thus causing the retreat of Mackensen's platoon and the reversal of von Falkenhayn's platoon's flank. The plan succeeded in its early stage, as the Romanian and Russian forces managed to surprise the enemy. Romanian forces captured thousands of prisoners and significant quantities of material during this counter-offensive. German General Erich Ludendorff considered the situation to be very serious: "On 1 December the left flank of the Danube Army was very powerfully attacked southwest of Bucharest and pushed back. The German troops who crossed the Neajlov were cut off and isolated. The situation most certainly became very critical." Only the last-minute intervention of the 26th Turkish Infantry Division on 2 December saved Mackensen's group from encirclement.

The Romanians suffered a considerable setback when a staff car carrying attack plans accidentally drove into a German position and was captured. These plans were vital to the Germans. As various developments took place, (General Culcer's "betrayal", the lack of involvement on the part of the Russian armed forces), the German, Bulgarian and Turkish forces, by taking advantage of their superior numbers, soon managed to recover and push back the Romanian forces, leaving the way to the capital open.

Thus, on 6 December 1916, the German troops entered Bucharest and occupied it. Ultimately, the Romanian Government and the Romanian armed forces were forced to retreat to Moldavia.

Even though the Battle for Bucharest was lost, it only served as a tactical defeat in the end, as the Central Powers failed their strategic goal of eliminating Romania from the war.

The Battle for Bucharest is considered to be the most complex military operation undertaken by the Romanian Army in 1916, both because of the number of men involved and because of its length, as well as because of the length of its front line.

== Aftermath ==
After the battle, minor actions were fought in the fortifications surrounding Bucharest between the invading Germans and the Romanian reserves which had failed to arrive due to the actions of Alexandru Socec, a subordinate of Constantin Prezan and a naturalized German. The city was eventually occupied by the Central Powers on 6 December. However, in spite of the human, material, and military efforts made by the Central Powers throughout this period, they failed to achieve their fundamental political and strategic goal, namely Romania's defeat and her getting out of the war. Despite heavy casualties, some 250,000 men, which were almost one third of the manpower mobilized in August 1916, and losses of combat material, the Romanian Army was still a force taken into consideration by allies and enemies alike and capable of offering resistance to further attacks. Before retreating, Romanian troops burned down the oil wells at Ploiești along with the surrounding wheat fields so as to keep them out of the hands of the Central Powers.

Bucharest was eventually liberated after the Central Powers' surrender in 1918.
