= Frăsinet (river) =

- Location within Romania

Location
- Country: Romania
- Counties: Dolj County, Olt County
- Villages: Ciocănești, Frăsinetu

Physical characteristics
- Mouth: Teslui
  - location: Dobrosloveni
  - coordinates: 44.1699°N 24.3552°E
- Length: 24 km (15 mi)
- Basin size: 72 km^{2} (28 sq mi)

Basin features
- Progression: Teslui→ Olt→ Danube→ Black Sea
- Tributaries
  - left: Valea Lungenilor
- River code: VIII.1.175.5

The Frăsinet is a right tributary of the river Teslui in Romania. It flows into the Teslui in Dobrosloveni. Its length is 24 km (15 mi) and its basin size is 72 km^{2} (28 sq mi).
