= Pleșoi =

- Commune
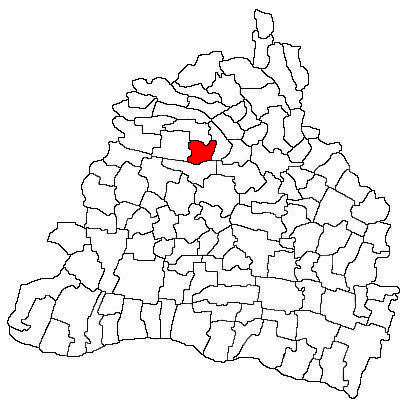
- Location in Dolj County

- Location in Romania
- Coordinates: 44°21′N 23°32′E
- Country: Romania
- County: Dolj
- Area: 42 km^{2} (16 sq mi)
- Population (2021-12-01): 1,158
  - Density: 28/km^{2} (71/sq mi)
- Time zone: UTC+02:00 (EET)
  - Summer (DST): UTC+03:00 (EEST)
- Vehicle reg.: DJ

Pleșoi is a commune in Dolj County, Oltenia, Romania with a population of 3,800 people. It is composed of four villages: Cârstovani, Frasin, Milovan and Pleșoi. These belonged to Predești Commune until 2004, when they were split off.
