= Robănești =

- Commune
- Location in Romania
- Coordinates: 44.310°N 24.016°E
- Country: Romania
- County: Dolj
- Area: 59.69 km^{2} (23.05 sq mi)
- Population (2021-12-01): 2,164
  - Density: 36.25/km^{2} (93.90/sq mi)
- Time zone: UTC+02:00 (EET)
  - Summer (DST): UTC+03:00 (EEST)
- Vehicle reg.: DJ

Robănești is a commune in Dolj County, Oltenia, Romania, with a population of 2,821 people. It is composed of six villages: Bojoiu, Golfin, Lăcrița Mare, Lăcrița Mică, Robăneștii de Jos (the commune center) and Robăneștii de Sus.

== See also ==
Battle of Robănești
