= Teslui, Dolj =

- Commune
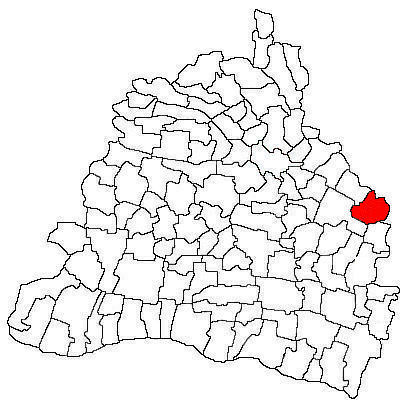
- Location in Dolj County

- Location in Romania
- Coordinates: 44°12′N 24°09′E
- Country: Romania
- County: Dolj
- Area: 59.65 km^{2} (23.03 sq mi)
- Population (2021-12-01): 2,110
  - Density: 35.4/km^{2} (91.6/sq mi)
- Time zone: UTC+02:00 (EET)
  - Summer (DST): UTC+03:00 (EEST)
- Vehicle reg.: DJ

Teslui is a commune in Dolj County, Oltenia, Romania with a population of 2,781 people. It is composed of eight villages: Coșereni, Fântânele, Preajba de Jos, Preajba de Pădure, Teslui, Țărțăl, Urieni and Viișoara-Moșneni.
