= Fărcașele =

- Commune
- Seal

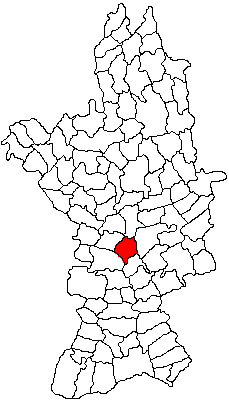
- Location in Olt County

- Location in Romania
- Coordinates: 44.1473°N 24.4386°E
- Country: Romania
- County: Olt
- Population (2021-12-01): 4,215
- Time zone: UTC+02:00 (EET)
  - Summer (DST): UTC+03:00 (EEST)
- Vehicle reg.: OT

Fărcașele is a commune in Olt County, Oltenia, Romania. It is composed of four villages: Fărcașele, Fărcașu de Jos, Ghimpați and Hotărani.
