= Pielești =

- Commune
- Location in Romania
- Coordinates: 44.328°N 23.973°E
- Country: Romania
- County: Dolj
- Area: 65.5 km^{2} (25.3 sq mi)
- Population (2021-12-01): 4,666
  - Density: 71.2/km^{2} (185/sq mi)
- Time zone: UTC+02:00 (EET)
  - Summer (DST): UTC+03:00 (EEST)
- Vehicle reg.: DJ

Pielești is a commune in Dolj County, Oltenia, Romania with a population of 3,609 people in 2011. It is composed of three villages: Câmpeni, Lânga, and Pielești.

== Natives ==
- Virginia Bonci (1949–2020), track and field athlete
