= Drăgotești, Dolj =

Drăgotești
- Commune
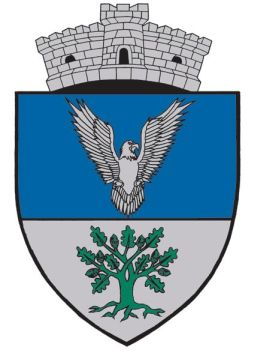
- Coat of arms

- Location in Romania
- Coordinates: 44.2476°N 24.0796°E
- Country: Romania
- County: Dolj
- Population (2021-12-01): 1,899
- Time zone: UTC+02:00 (EET)
  - Summer (DST): UTC+03:00 (EEST)
- Vehicle reg.: DJ

Drăgotești is a commune in Dolj County, Oltenia, Romania with a population of 2,630 people. It is composed of six villages: Benești, Bobeanu, Buzduc, Drăgotești, Popânzălești and Viișoara.
