= 11th Bavarian Infantry Division =

11th Bavarian Infantry Division (11. Bayerische Infanterie-Division)
- Active: 1915-1919
- Country: Kingdom of Bavaria/German Empire
- Branch: Army
- Type: Infantry
- Size: Approx. 12,500
- Engagements: World War I: Gorlice-Tarnów Offensive, Serbian Campaign (World War I), Battle of Verdun, Confronting Brusilov Offensive, Romanian Campaign (World War I), Second Battle of the Aisne, Passchendaele, Third Battle of the Aisne, Second Battle of the Marne

The 11th Bavarian Infantry Division (11. Bayerische Infanterie-Division) was a unit of the Royal Bavarian Army, part of the Imperial German Army, in World War I. The division was formed on March 24, 1915, and organized over the next few weeks. It was part of a wave of new infantry divisions formed in the spring of 1915. The division was disbanded in 1919 during the demobilization of the German Army after World War I.

The division was formed primarily from the excess infantry regiments of existing divisions that were being triangularized. The division's 21st Bavarian Infantry Brigade was formerly the 4th Bavarian Infantry Brigade of the 2nd Bavarian Infantry Division. The 3rd Bavarian Infantry Regiment also came from the 2nd Bavarian Infantry Division; the 22nd Bavarian Infantry Regiment came from the 3rd Bavarian Infantry Division; and the 13th Bavarian Reserve Infantry Regiment came from the 5th Bavarian Reserve Division.

== Combat chronicle ==
The 11th Bavarian Infantry Division initially served on the Eastern Front, where it fought in the Gorlice-Tarnów Offensive, seeing action at Przemyśl, Lemberg, and Chełm (Cholm) and advancing to the western edge of Pripyat Marshes by August. The division was then transferred south and participated in the Serbian Campaign. It was in reserve in Syrmia from November 1915 to February 1916, and was then transferred to the Western Front. From March to May 1916, it fought in the Battle of Verdun, and then returned to the Eastern Front to help stop the Brusilov Offensive. After fighting in the Battle of Kovel, the division went to the Romanian front, where it remained until January 1917. Again it was transferred to the Western Front, initially serving in Upper Alsace. It then fought in the Second Battle of the Aisne, also known as the Third Battle of Champagne (and to the Germans as the Double Battle on the Aisne and in Champagne). It also saw action in the Battle of Passchendaele. It remained in the line on various parts of the Western Front until the end of April 1918, when it went to the Belgian/Dutch border. The division then fought in the Third Battle of the Aisne and remained in the line near Soissons, seeing action in the Second Battle of the Marne. It then went to Flanders, where it remained until the end of the war. Allied intelligence rated the division as first class.

== Order of battle on formation ==
The 11th Bavarian Infantry Division was formed as a triangular division. The order of battle of the division on April 1, 1915, was as follows:

- Kgl. Bayerische 21. Infanterie-Brigade
  - Kgl. Bayerisches 3. Infanterie-Regiment Prinz Karl von Bayern
  - Kgl. Bayerisches 22. Infanterie-Regiment Fürst Wilhelm von Hohenzollern
  - Kgl. Bayerisches Reserve-Infanterie-Regiment Nr. 13
- 1.Eskadron/Kgl. Bayerisches 2. Chevaulegers-Regiment Taxis
- 2.Eskadron/Kgl. Bayerisches 7. Chevaulegers-Regiment Prinz Alfons
- Kgl. Bayerisches 21. Feldartillerie-Regiment
- 5.Batterie/Kgl. Bayerisches Reserve-Fußartillerie-Regiment Nr. 2
- Kgl. Bayerische Pionier-Kompanie Nr. 21

== Late-war order of battle ==
The division underwent relatively few organizational changes over the course of the war. Cavalry was reduced, artillery and signals commands were formed, and combat engineer support was expanded to a full pioneer battalion. The order of battle on January 4, 1918, was as follows:

- Kgl. Bayerische 21. Infanterie-Brigade
  - Kgl. Bayerisches 3. Infanterie-Regiment Prinz Karl von Bayern
  - Kgl. Bayerisches 22. Infanterie-Regiment Fürst Wilhelm von Hohenzollern
  - Kgl. Bayerisches Reserve-Infanterie-Regiment Nr. 13
- 2.Eskadron/Kgl. Bayerisches 7. Chevaulegers-Regiment Prinz Alfons
- Kgl. Bayerischer Artillerie-Kommandeur 11
  - Kgl. Bayerisches 21. Feldartillerie-Regiment
  - Kgl. Bayerisches Fußartillerie-Regiment Nr. 11 (from June 12, 1918)
- Kgl. Bayerisches Pionier-Bataillon Nr. 11
  - Kgl. Bayerische Pionier-Kompanie Nr. 19
  - Kgl. Bayerische Pionier-Kompanie Nr. 21
  - Kgl. Bayerische Minenwerfer-Kompanie Nr. 11
- Kgl. Bayerischer Divisions-Nachrichten-Kommandeur 11
