= Battle of the Argeș =

1916 battle during World War I

Coordinates: 44°16′N 26°3′E

Battle of the Argeş
- Part of the Battle of Bucharest of the Romanian Campaign of World War I
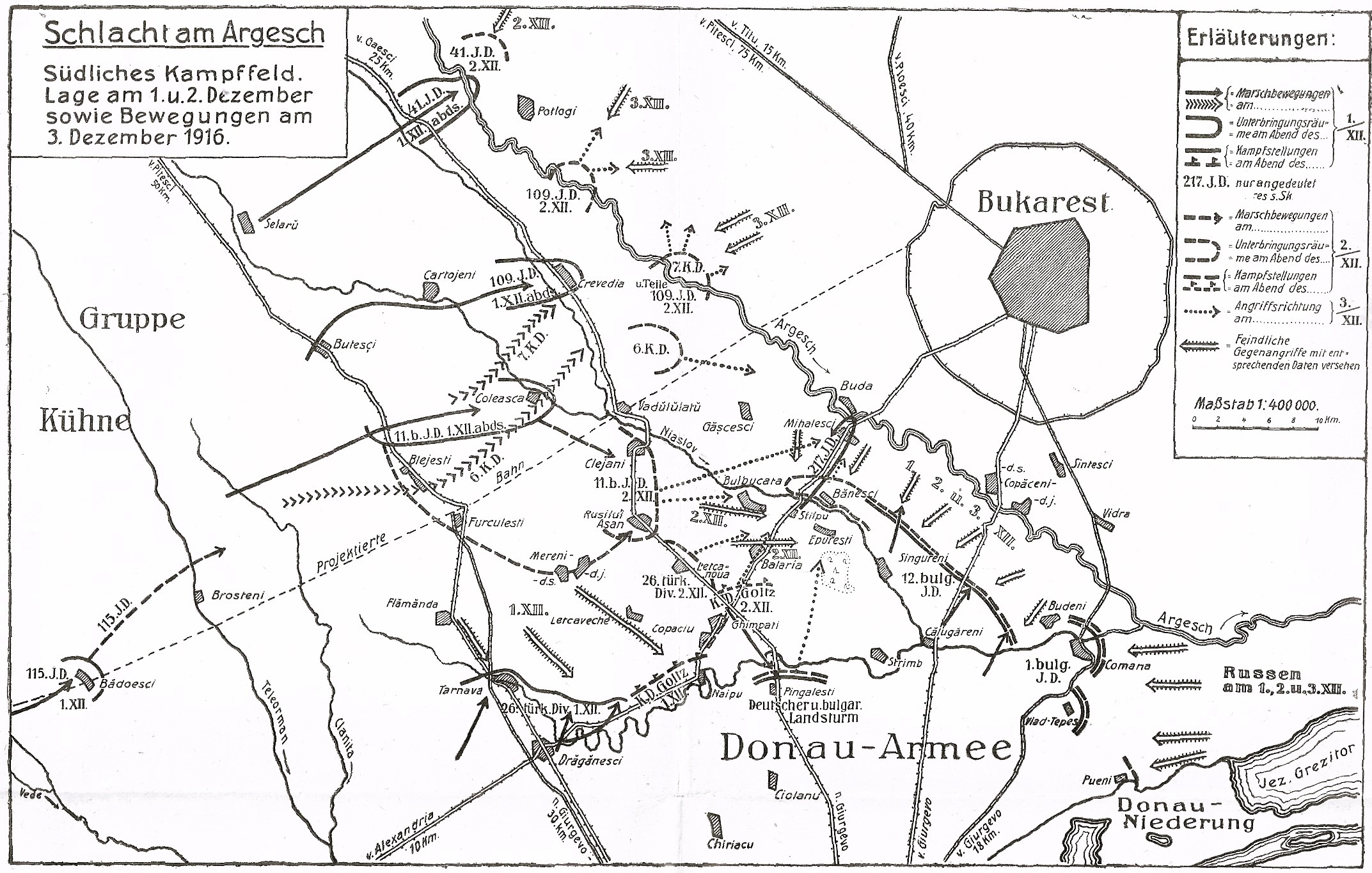
- German map of the battle
Date	1–3 December 1916
Location	Bucharest, Romania
Result	Central Powers victory

Belligerents
Kingdom of Romania; Russian Empire	German Empire; Tsardom of Bulgaria; Ottoman Empire; Austria-Hungary

Commanders and leaders
(Kingdom of Romania) Constantin Prezan	(German Empire) Erich von Falkenhayn (German Empire) August von Mackensen

Strength
(Kingdom of Romania) Romanian First Army; 9 Infantry divisions 2 Cavalry divisions 150,000 soldiers	(German Empire) Danube Army (German Empire) German Ninth Army; 11 Infantry divisions 3 Cavalry divisions 175,000 soldiers

Casualties and losses
Unknown dead or wounded 60,000 prisoners	Unknown

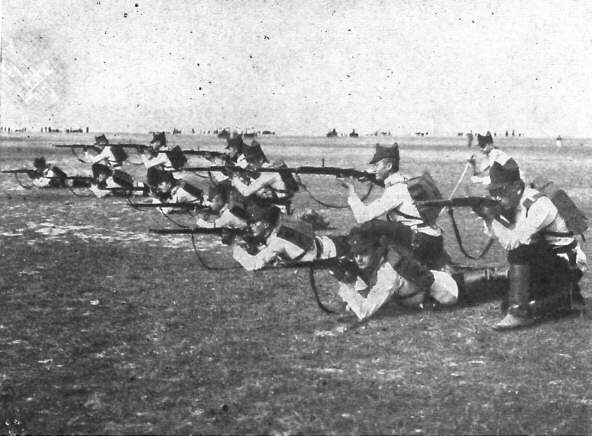
Romanian soldiers during a training exercise. The rifle is the Mannlicher M1893, the standard service rifle of the Kingdom of Romania at the time.

The Battle of the Argeș took place during the Romanian Campaign of World War I on 1 December 1916. The battle was fought along the line of the Argeș River in Romania between Austro-German forces of the Central Powers and Romanian forces with the Russian imperial forces.

== Background ==
In late November 1916, Germano-Bulgarian forces under August von Mackensen crossed the Danube near Zimnicea under the cover of fog and began to march on Bucharest. The Romanians had transferred most of their forces to the Carpathians and as a result the Central Powers forces had a preponderant advantage: 18 Romanian battalions and 48 artillery pieces against 40 German and Bulgarian battalions and 188 guns. This attack threatened to cut off half the Romanian Army and so the decision was made to launch a counterattack. Relying upon the Russians to contain the fighting elsewhere, the plan entailed using all of the Romanian Army's reserves to launch a flanking attack on the German forces as they crossed the Argeș River, the last natural barrier before Bucharest.

The Russians did not agree to this plan of action, but nevertheless plans for the attack went ahead. The French sent a military mission to Romania and its commander, Henri Mathias Berthelot, who had been Joseph Joffre's chief of staff during the Battle of the Marne in 1914 felt that the attack could bring a similar success. In this regard he advocated the buildup of a Romanian forces, drawing divisions from the Danube and the Carpathians.

== Battle ==
On 1 December the Romanian attack began. Initially, the Romanians experienced success, taking a large number of prisoners, however, the failure of their reserves to arrive due to the actions of the Romanian General Sosescu, who was a naturalized German, followed by the arrival of German reinforcements led to their weakening and eventual defeat. Mackensen was able to shift forces to deal with the sudden assault and Falkenhayn's forces responded with attacks at every point. Within three days, the attack had been shattered and the Romanians were retreating everywhere. Part of the Romanian Army was cut off from the city after German forces conducted a pincer movement north and south of the river. The Romanians suffered a considerable setback when a staff car carrying attack plans accidentally drove into a German position and was captured.

Before retreating, Romanian troops burned down the oil wells at Ploiești along with the surrounding wheat fields so as to keep them out of the hands of the Central Powers. After Falkenhayen's Ninth Army cut off a portion of the Romanian Army, the remainder retreated to the Siret–Putna defensive line, one of the outermost defensive lines of Bucharest. There they rendezvoused with the Bucharest garrison and prepared to hold the line.

== Aftermath ==
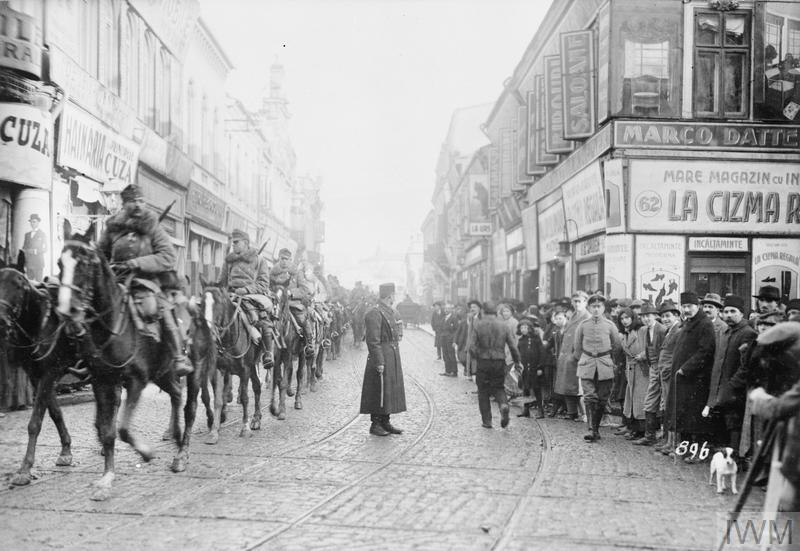
Austro-Hungarian cavalry entering Bucharest on 6 December 1916

After the battle, minor actions were fought in the fortifications surrounding Bucharest between the invading Germans and the Romanian reserves which had failed to arrive and the remnants of the defenders of the Sereth–Putna line, yet it was occupied by the Germans on 6 December 1916, which was the same day that southern Romania capitulated, as the monarchy had fled to Iași. Heavy rain and terrible roads were the only things that saved the remainder of the Romanian Army, which began to withdraw towards the Siret River and Russia, where the campaign drew to a close in January 1917. Romanian losses during the battle on the Argeș and the fighting that preceded it were very high, with about 300,000 being lost, around 150,000 of which were captured. In this same period, the Germans had suffered about 60,000 casualties.

The German heritage of General Alexandru Socec, a subordinate of Constantin Prezan, has been the topic of several debates regarding the battle regarding the Romanian reserves.
