= Dobrosloveni =

- Commune
- Flag Seal

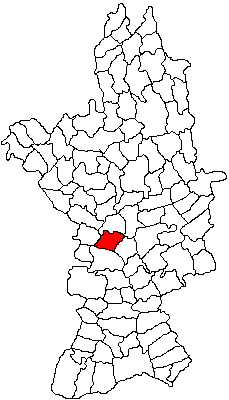
- Location in Olt County

- Location in Romania
- Coordinates: 44°11′N 24°22′E
- Country: Romania
- County: Olt
- Population (2021-12-01): 3,472
- Time zone: UTC+02:00 (EET)
  - Summer (DST): UTC+03:00 (EEST)
- Vehicle reg.: OT

Dobrosloveni is a commune in Olt County, Oltenia, Romania. It is composed of five villages: Dobrosloveni, Frăsinetu, Potopinu, Reșca and Reșcuța.

According to the 2002 census, it had a population of 3,909, of which 99% were ethnic Romanians. The commune's village of Reșca contains remains of an ancient Roman municipium, named Romula or Malva.
