= Sasa =

Sasa may refer to:

== People ==
- Saša, a given name
- Genjū Sasa (1900–1959), Japanese film director and critic
- Shinzo Sasa (born 1935), Japanese equestrian
- Sa'sa'a bin Sohan (598–666), a companion of Imam Ali revered by Shia Muslims
- Sasa (politician), special envoy to the United Nations for the national legislative body (CRPH) of Myanmar
- Chung Hsin-yu (also known as Sasa), Taiwanese host and actress

== Places ==
- Sa'sa', Palestine, a Palestinian village depopulated during the 1948 Arab–Israeli War
- Sasa, Israel, a kibbutz in Galilee, Israel
- Sasa, North Macedonia, a village in the Makedonska Kamenica Municipality
- Sa'sa', Syria, a town in the Rif Dimashq Governorate
- Sasa, a barangay in Buhangin District, Davao City
  - Sasa Wharf (Sasa International Seaport), part of the Port of Davao

== Other uses ==
- Sasa (dance), a Samoan dance
- Sasa (plant), a genus of bamboo
- Sasa (video game), an arcade video game released for the MSX1
- Solvent-accessible surface area, the surface area of a biomolecule that is accessible to a solvent
- Sa Sa International Holdings, a Hong Kong chainstore
- Shekere, a musical instrument also known as "sasa" or "saasaa"

== See also ==
- Sása (disambiguation), several villages in Slovakia
- Șasa (disambiguation), several places in Romania
- Sașa (disambiguation), several places in Romania
- SASA (disambiguation)
