= Constantin S. Nicolăescu-Plopșor =

Romanian scholar, writer, politician, and Romani activist (1900–1968)

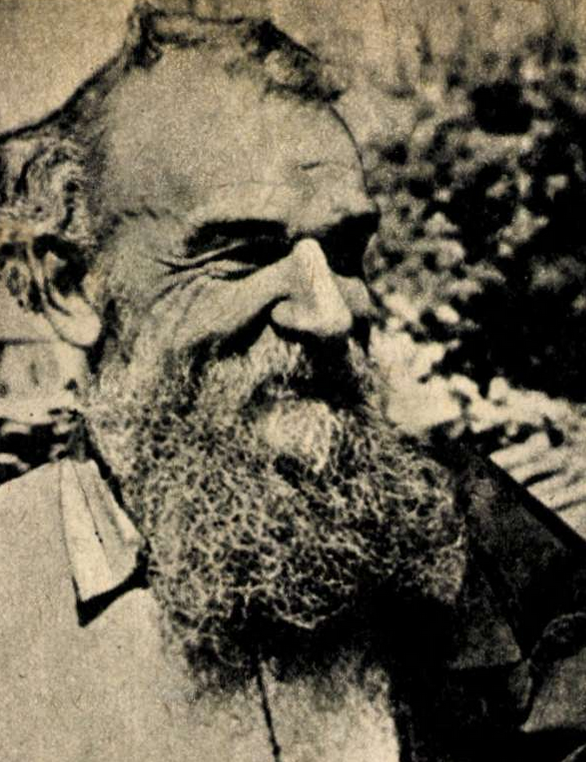
- Nicolăescu-Plopșor c. 1960
- Born: Constantin Nicolăescu; April 20, 1900; Sălcuța, Dolj County, Kingdom of Romania
- Died: May 30, 1968 (aged 68); Bucharest, Socialist Republic of Romania
- Resting place: Sineasca Cemetery, Craiova
- Other names: Nicolaescu-Plopșor; N. Plopșor; Moș Plopșor

Academic background
- Education: University of Bucharest
- Influences: Cezar Bolliac; Joseph Déchelette; Vasile Pârvan

Academic work
- Era: 20th century
- Main interests: Anthropology; paleoanthropology; archaeology; folkloristics; ethnography; religious anthropology; human geography; historical geography; museology; Romanian literature; Romanian folklore; Romani studies; Romani folklore
- Influenced: Alexandru Cerna-Rădulescu

Constantin S. Nicolăescu-Plopșor or Nicolaescu-Plopșor, sometimes shortened to N. Plopșor (Romanian pronunciation: [konstanˈtin nikoləˈesku plopˈʃor]; April 20, 1900 – May 30, 1968), was a Romanian historian, archaeologist, anthropologist and ethnographer, also known as a folkorist and children's writer, whose diverse activities were primarily focused on his native region of Oltenia. A student and disciple of Vasile Pârvan at the University of Bucharest, he had a youthful activity collecting and publishing Oltenian songs and poetry, being the first to document Romanian folklore as produced during the peasants' revolt of 1907, and committing to writing the regional variants of Miorița ballad. Increasingly interested in the Balkans' prehistoric period, he researched various Paleolithic, Mesolithic, and Neolithic sites in his native country, placing them in a larger European context while producing his own systems of Prehistoric chronology and typology. His main contributions to archaeology include the classification of Oltenian microliths, the study of local cave paintings, and the disputed claim that a site in Tetoiu evidenced a regional contribution to anthropogenesis.

An active collector of art, including a trove of Romanian icons and modern public art by Constantin Brâncuși, Nicolăescu-Plopșor was also known for his activity as a museologist and head of the Museum of Oltenia in Craiova. During the interwar, he became noted as both a politician and activist for the welfare of the Romani-Romanian minority, also amassing land as an agriculturalist. Before World War II, he was one of the regional Oltenian leaders for the emerging Romani political movement, and a contributor to some of the first Romani-language newspapers in local history; chased out of the burgeoning movement by its internal schisms, he was for a while a prominent figure in the National Liberal Party-Brătianu, before being co-opted by the National Renaissance Front. Plopșor was additionally a follower of Christian mystic Petrache Lupu, whose preaching he explored in a work of religious anthropology. His contribution to Romanian literature includes collections of folklore and Romani mythology, editions of works by other Oltenian writers, as well as original anecdotes and quasi-fairy tales with folkloric roots. Plopșor drew attention, both positive and negative, for his heavy reliance on the Oltenian dialect, being sometimes incomprehensible to his non-Oltenian readers.

Nicolăescu-Plopșor's career peaked after the onset of Romanian communism in the 1950s. Although forced to sell his own land, he was controversially involved in the 1949 nationalization of Victor N. Popp's estate; he also adapted his style to Soviet historiography and the Stalin cult. Plopșor led both a national archaeological section and Craiova's ethnographic branch of the Romanian Academy, of which he was elected a corresponding member in 1963. He was additionally tasked with directing teams of researchers at Bicaz, the Iron Gates, and Ada Kaleh. Involved with a literary club formed around Ramuri magazine, he published his final book of children's fiction, Tivisoc și Tivismoc, in 1965, and turned it into a screenplay the following year.

== Biography ==
=== Early life ===
The future scholar was born "Constantin Nicolăescu", with "Plopșor" being originally a literary pseudonym. His native village was Sălcuța, Dolj County, Kingdom of Romania. His birth date is generally given as April 20, 1900, though some records have March 31. Of partial Romani Romanian ancestry, he was the descendant of Dincă Schileru, an Oltenian peasant representative in the ad-hoc Divan which decided on the 1859 union between Wallachia and Moldavia. Specifically, his mother Polina was Schileru's daughter. Accounts differ as to her husband (and Constantin's father): some sources credit him as Nicolae Ion, a sharecropper who had received a family plot during the 1860s land reform, while others refer to him as Stan, and report that he was a wealthy landowner, with a "very imposing" manor to his name.

One of several boys born to the couple, Constantin was a sickly child, sometimes neglected by his parents—who feared that he was afflicted by tuberculosis. They eventually remarked his natural inquisitiveness, and agreed to finance his education. This began at Obedeanu Preparatory School of Craiova; Constantin then completed his secondary studies at the Carol I National College, as a protege of teacher Ștefan Ciuceanu. One of his teachers encouraged all students to collect various remains of historical importance, including "the bones of Uriași". This hobby worried his father, who saw it as merely a form of scavenging. Initially destined for a career in the Romanian Orthodox Church, Constantin preferred literature, but without interrupting his archaeological pursuits.

This career path was diverted during World War I and the series of Romanian defeats. The adolescent Nicolăescu-Plopșor followed the Romanian Army to Western Moldavia, where he trained as a tinsmith for the ammunition factory in Dângeni. For the remainder of his life, he took pride in his certified work in the industry, as well as in his having received the War Cross. During those years, he crossed into Bessarabia, and later took credit for discovering prehistoric flint tools at Stânca Doamnei. In 1922, upon the consolidation of Greater Romania, Nicolăescu-Plopșor's first samples of regional Oltenian folklore appeared in the magazine Convorbiri Literare. He was for a while after among the most frequently published contributors in that magazine. Another article, carried by Revista Societății Tinerimea Română, detailed his ideas on Gypsy ethnogenesis. In tandem, Buletinul Societății Regale Române de Geografie hosted his typology of Oltenian pit-houses, or bordeie, as his first contribution to human geography. At Oltenia magazine, he was focusing on inventorying oral poems by a quasi-anonymous author, Radu of Giubega, in particular ones dealing with the peasants' revolt of March 1907. He became the first folklorist to ignore a self-imposed silence about the revolutionary events, though the actual task of collecting Radu's poems went to three other amateur folklorists—Ion Voinescu of Orodel, Ștefan Tuțescu, and Petre Danielescu. Also in 1922, Plopșor became honorary director of the Museum of Oltenia, a regional institution founded in 1915, and where he was curator of the Archaeology and Folklore Section. The collection was largely based on objects he had gathered during his many field trips.

Shortly after, Plopșor was appointed a substitute history teacher in Plenița, focusing of investigating, documenting and preserving evidence about the historical past of Oltenian villages. He set as his personal ambition an archaeological scrutiny of the entire region, in order to uncover "the traces of the most ancient people to have inhabited Oltenia", a population he initially believed had originated in Asia. Nicolăescu-Plopșor established a peasants' newspaper, also based in Plenița. Called Redeșteptarea ("The Renaissance"), it sought to defend the rural population from injustice and "usury". He had not yet completed his tertiary education: in 1924, he graduated magna cum laude from the University of Bucharest Faculty of Letters and History. During that time, he became a disciple of Romanian historian Vasile Pârvan, noted for his work in researching and classifying the antiquities of Dacia, and was colleagues with medievalist Constantin C. Giurescu. A sketch story of his, La struguri ("With the Grapes"), saw print in the inaugural issue of Suflet Românesc, in 1925. In 1927, he joined Teodor Bălășel in setting up the Brotherhood of Oltenian Folklorists, seen by poet Alexandru Cerna-Rădulescu as "the first Romanian attempt to scientifically coordinate and systematize folklore collections." Also that year, Plopșor began putting out the review Suflet Oltenesc ("Oltenian Soul"). The following year, he published, as N. Plopșor, the volume Ceaùr. Povești oltenești ("Woozy. Oltenian Stories"). Literary chronicler Șerban Cioculescu, who knew the work simply as Ceaùr, reports that it and all other interwar books by the same author had a minuscule circulation.

Around 1923, Nicolăescu-Plopșor had begun digging on elevated sites known locally as măguri, uncovering crouched skeletons with residues of ochre, before turning his attention to other locations, where he discovered the remains of prehistoric dwellings. In the early 1930s, his discovery of microliths at Carpen (Cleanov village) and his native Sălcuța (Plopșor) led him to propose the existence of two Mesolithic archaeological industries native to Oltenia, a theory first outlined at the 15th International Congress of Anthropology. In 1926, he traveled to Gorj County, where he documented the existence of a hunting-themed and charcoal-based cave painting in the proximity of cave bear bones and Copper Age pottery, but did not disclose its exact location (probably as a means to ensure its better protection). He is also credited with having dug up the first mastodon remains on Romanian territory, at Stoina. Spurred on by the research of French scholar Henri Breuil, with whom he began corresponding, Nicolăescu-Plopșor visited other such sites in Oltenia's Southern Carpathian areas: Baia de Fier (Peștera Muierilor), Peștera Boierilor, Peștera Oilor, Romos, etc. By the end of his career, he had explored some 120 individual caves.

=== Romani activism ===
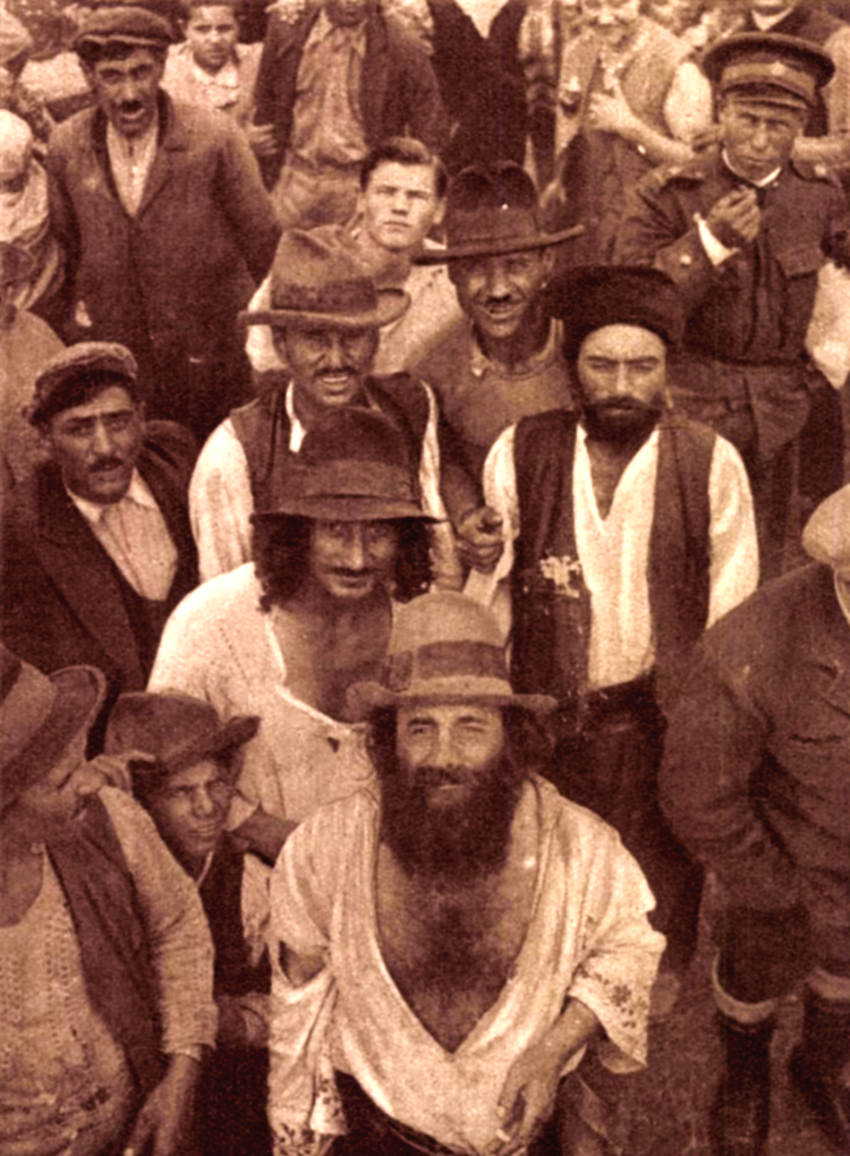
Romanies attending a congress of Calinic Șerboianu's General Association of Gypsies, September 1933

During his time in Plenița, Nicolăescu-Plopșor had eloped with his first cousin, Maria, who became his wife—the only one in the family not to oppose their union was Constantin's wealthy father. He made sure that both his son and his niece received ample supplies of food while they built a new home in that village. In 1926, the young scholar and poet Radu Gyr were in Drăgășani, hosted there by their novelist friend, Gib Mihăescu. Constantin entertained the others with stories, drawing Gyr's admiration with both his talent and his "zany beard". Plopșor was by then also a contributor to Arhivele Olteniei and Năzuința Românească. Scholar N. I. Herescu, who published the latter as a self-styled regionalist magazine, rated his colleague's work in folkloristics as "always interesting". Also that year, Nicolăescu-Plopșor recorded and published in Arhivele Olteniei 25 Oltenian variants of the national ballad, Miorița, at least one of which is significantly richer in solar symbolism than the standardized version. He followed up with another folklore collection, the 1930 Toiagul priotesii [sic] ("The Priest Wife's Cane"). In recognition of his archaeological expertise, in 1932 he was granted a Ph. D. by the University of Bucharest; he then underwent specialization in Paris, at the Anthropology Institute (to 1934). In tandem, he worked on collecting folklore from his native area, initially focusing on musical sources, the so-called cântece bătrânești ("old people songs"), and later following up with fairy tales and other prose works. His interest in inventorying folkloric elements often merged with his archaeological work: reportedly, his explorations were accompanied by thorough interviews with locals, and purchases of traditional objects.

Nicolăescu-Plopșor branched out into researching Romani folklore as early as November 1924, when he published and translated a sample of the "Gypsy language" in Flamura magazine. Shortly after 1930, he rallied with other intellectuals of Romani origin—Aurel Manolescu-Dolj, N. St. Ionescu, Marin I. Simion—in creating the first modern Romani (or "Gypsy") organization in Oltenia. It initially collaborated with the traditional structure of bulibașas, or local community leaders, as well as with the national associations founded by Orthodox Archimandrite and Romani activist Calinic Șerboianu, until Manolescu-Dolj and Simion split the local group and proclaimed themselves each Great Voivode of the Gypsies in Oltenia. Before these schisms, Plopșor was involved with the organization's two cultural venues, the newspapers Timpul and O Ròm, and published two bilingual Romani–Romanian collections of Romani song lyrics and mythology: Ghileà romanè - Cântece țigănești ("Gypsy Songs") and Paramiseà romanè - Povești țigănești ("Gypsy Stories"). In so doing, he became part of a cultural and political movement advocating the desegregation of Romani people into Romanian society, the replacement of Romanian word țigani (the equivalent of "Gypsies") with romi ("Romani people"), as well as the modernization of Romani society and culture. Linguist Alexandru Graur, who reviewed Ghileà romanè in April 1934, noted that the source material was of little documentary value, urging Plopșor to publish more developed works. Graur also criticized Plopșor's written Romani: entirely modeled on the Romanian alphabet, it "could only render exact pronunciation with some approximation"; it also used the word variants most popular with the Ursari tribes, but not consistently so.

Nicolăescu-Plopșor's detailed plan, published by O Ròm, supported making Romani a language for the church service in certain communities—he was among the first to propose its introduction into the Romanian curriculum. In addition to such designs, which went as far as to demand a "Roma Church" within Romanian Orthodoxy, he envisioned the creation of a Roma Museum and a Roma illustrated encyclopedia, as well as a program to record and inventory all forms of Romani music. As Romanian historian Viorel Achim notes: "These ideas indicate the emphasis placed on the preservation of the Gypsies' identity. However, some [Romani association members] promoted integrationist ideas, such as the sedentarisation of nomadic Gypsies at all cost, so the Gypsy movement in Romania in the 1930s cannot be considered a 'nationalist' movement." According to local tradition, Plopșor himself owned some 300 hectares of land in Sălcuța, and brought in Romanies as colonists, to live on his estate.

Nicolăescu-Plopșor in 1935

Eventually, the inner-communal split harmed Nicolăescu-Plopșor's aspirations: Timpul, which remained a platform for Manolescu-Dolj's faction, called him a "Gypsy crook". Gheorghe Nicolescu's new community group, the General Union of Roma in Romania, claimed Plopșor as one of its collaborators. In September 1934, Nicolescu's secretary, Lengescu, argued: "We will need educated Roma [...]. There are already initiatives in this direction. Dr. Nicolaescu-Plopșor, a teacher from Craiova who still claims to be a Gypsy, is working on a Gypsy grammar and dictionary." Lengescu believed that Ghileà romanè was "the first printed book in the Gypsy language that was published in Romania" and perhaps "in the whole world".

=== Georgism, mysticism, and "Oltenia Week" ===
Nicolăescu-Plopșor had by then turned to regular Romanian politics, initially as a member of the mainstream National Liberal Party (PNL). He quit that group in mid-1931, allegedly because he resented the policies of its Dolj-chapter leader, Constantin Neamțu. Reporting on this, Lupta newspaper noted that his departure had weakened the PNL's support among the peasantry. By his own account, Plopșor was also disappointed with the two-party system, which also included the National Peasants' Party; when one of the latter's least cultured politicians asked him to ghostwrite his speech, he purposefully infused it with ridiculous phrasing and self-mockery. He joined the National Liberal Party-Brătianu, or "Georgists", which had coalesced PNL defectors. In May 1932, he was leader of the Georgists' chapter in Dolj, and a member of their Oltenian Bureau. He took part in campaigning for the general election of December 1933, and was sustained a head wound during a related incident in Craiova. The authorities alleged that he had been brandishing a revolver, which prompted political adversaries to subdue him; an opposition newspaper, Cuvântul, challenged this claim, arguing that he had been pounced upon while walking down Madona Street. Nicolăescu-Plopșor then stood as a Georgist candidate in the 1934 elections for the Dolj County Council.

Nicolăescu-Plopșor managed to set up his own agricultural estate in Plenița, using its yields of wheat to finance his intellectual pursuits. He also helped organize an International Numismatic Congress, held at Craiova in 1934; on this occasion, he discovered the 15-year-old Octavian Iliescu, a future researcher in the field, whom he tasked with carrying out an inventory of available coins. In tandem, Plopșor was active as a publisher: also in 1934, he issued in Craiova a modern edition of Hronograful, from the early 19th-century manuscript of Dionisie Eclesiarhul, the recluse Wallachian monk. Cerna-Rădulescu, who recalls being his disciple in the 1930s, also notes that he was putting out editions of historical memoirs by Ioan Solomon, collecting and recording by hand Radu of Giubega's full work (some 75,000 lines of verse), as well as printing "at his own expense" the literary works of his Oltenian peers. In addition, he was directing a literary society hosted by Casa Băniei of Craiova. Plopșor was also putting out a regional-themed book collection, under the name of Pământ și Suflet Oltenesc ("Oltenian Land and Spirit"), noted for its publication of Ilariu Dobridor's verse and his own set of memoirs (as Amintiri). The project also involved the local writer Eugen Constant, whose conferences helped to sponsor the publications.

Nicolăescu-Plopșor's involvement in cultural affairs also continued through his election as adviser to the Archdiocese of Craiova, during which time he participated in the Maglavit gatherings, celebrating the shepherd-turned-Orthodox mystic, Petrache Lupu. During August 1935, he addressed the Maglavit crowds, alongside journalists such as Stelian Popescu and Pamfil Șeicaru. In September, he advised that Lupu go into a partial retirement to avoid exhausting himself. Before the year's close, he produced a work of religious anthropology, Maglavitul, which sought to investigate Lupu's claims of theophany from documentary evidence. By then, Plopșor was editing a new cultural magazine, Gând și Slovă Oltenească ("Oltenian Thinking and Writing"), listed by literary historian George Călinescu as one of the main interwar periodicals in the region (alongside Ramuri, Mihail Gușiță's Datina, and Constant's Condeiul). In 1938, he set up an Oltenian Archaeology Institute, also founding a Craiova branch of the National Archives—and serving as its director in 1939–1946.

The Maglavit issue endured on Plopșor's mind in May 1936, when he tried to bring it up during a session of Oltenia's Orthodox Metropolis, in Râmnicu Vâlcea. The local bishop, Vartolomeu Stănescu, prevented him from doing so, and instead used the floor to campaign for the far-right Iron Guard. Plopșor himself was still a Georgist politician during the general election of December 1937, when he appeared as third on a list of Dolj candidates, headlined by George Matei Cantacuzino. In 1940, during a dictatorial regime established by King Carol II, he joined the state political party, called National Renaissance Front, and its Dolj organization, headed by Emanuel Tătărescu.

Romanian government leader Ion Antonescu with Nicolăescu-Plopșor, at the 1943 "Oltenia Week"

Focusing on his scholarly work by 1942, Plopșor discovered and published a manuscript copy of Mihail Moxa's 17th-century chronicle. Also then, he was digging alongside Vladimir Dumitrescu at Cârna, whose parish priest had discovered a Bronze-Age necropolis. Plopșor participated in the "Oltenia Week", organized by Ramuri in November 1943. At this event, he networked with writers such as Virgil Carianopol, Mircea Damian, Elena Farago, George Gregorian and Ion Minulescu, as well as with singer Maria Tănase.

=== Communist turn ===
Nicolăescu-Plopșor reached scholarly prominence after World War II, and especially during the communist regime inaugurated in 1947–1948. In 1946, he was appointed the Museum of Oltenia's full director, holding the office until 1952. As noted in 1994 by literary columnist C. D. Zeletin, as early as 1945 he had become aware that the Romanian Communist Party would generate a new land reform, and liquidated his own interests as a landowner (this allowed him to serve as chairman of the expropriation board). As caretaker of the Oltenian Museum, Nicolăescu-Plopșor controversially participated in the nationalization of 1949. By his own account, he traveled to Victor N. Popp's manor in Ostroveni, which had just been confiscated by the authorities, and managed to retrieve several modern sculptures by Constantin Brâncuși, which Popp had collected. Zeletin reports a version of the story according to which Plopșor was "drifting around" Argetoaia when he chanced upon a version of Brâncuși's The Kiss, taken from the Popp collection by a local. The peasant was entirely unaware of its value, and was using it for fermenting cabbage. This version was partly backed, and partly corrected, by the conservator-restorer Petre Tănăsoaica. Though he notes that the sculpture was indeed used to weigh down cabbage, he places the events in Ostroveni. He also reports that Plopșor's person of contact was not a peasant, but in fact Popp's former aide, who "could not find the strength to abandon it and have it removed from his household circuit."

Nicolăescu-Plopșor was involved in the officially sanctioned campaign for peaceful coexistence, and, in March 1950, sat on the Dolj Committee for Peace Struggle. The anthropologist now made returns to Romani activism, infusing it with Marxism-Leninism and samples of Stalin's personality cult; these feature in a Romani-language poem, Ghilabos ăl rom ghilabos ("Let's Sing, Roma! Let's Sing!"), which he sent to be published by Viața Romînească in 1952; it was rejected. According to scholar Raluca Bianca Roman, the piece, authored or just collected by Plopșor, may have been written during the interwar. In 1951, he was assigned to a researcher's post at the Romanian Academy's Institute of Archaeology, where he led the Paleolithic Section. Also then, he was tasked with reporting on the opportunity of establishing a new museum at Slatina, Regiunea Argeș, an institution later redesigned as the Olt County Museum.

Communist repressions touched Plopșor's inner circle: by 1953, his collaborator Dumitrescu had been jailed; at Văcărești Prison, Dumitrescu was held alongside the engineer Bolomey, father of Plopșor's disciple Alexandra Bolomey, as well as alongside Cârna's priest (prosecuted as a former member of the Iron Guard). Plopșor's own preservation as a museum director was officially questioned in mid-1952, when musicologist Petre Brâncuș referred to him as a "former landowner" and a member of the "exploiting class". According to Brâncuș, he had never been challenged by his administrative supervisor, since the latter was himself a "hostile element". Plopșor was nonetheless successful in calling for the reestablishment of an Oltenian Orthodox Metropolis. His son Dardu Nicolăescu-Plopșor attended the Bucharest Faculty of Medicine from around 1952, and afterwards was assigned as a researcher for the Academy. A letter of protest by ethnologist Romulus Vuia reports that the family had occupied part of Vuia's home at the beginning of Dardu's scholarly career, and would still not return it in 1959.

After heading an "Institute of Complex Research" at Bicaz in 1956–1963, and before founding another one in the Iron Gates area (1966–1968), Plopșor Sr was made a corresponding member of the Academy in 1963. His admittance was granted in recognition "of his rich cultural and scientific activity". Following the post-1950 discoveries of Paleolithic human remains and choppers at the Bugiulești and Valea lui Grăunceanu locations in Tetoiu, as well as in other areas of northern Oltenia and Muntenia, he had become one of the main participants in uncovering and analyzing the newly opened sites. Personally heading such excavations after 1960, and working together with Dardu, he claimed to have discovered Australopithecus bones, and argued that these hominids engaged in conscious labor. Another focus of his work was the presence of Neanderthals at Bordul Mare (Șureanu Mountains), where he personally uncovered traces of habitation after a 1954 expedition.

=== Final activities ===
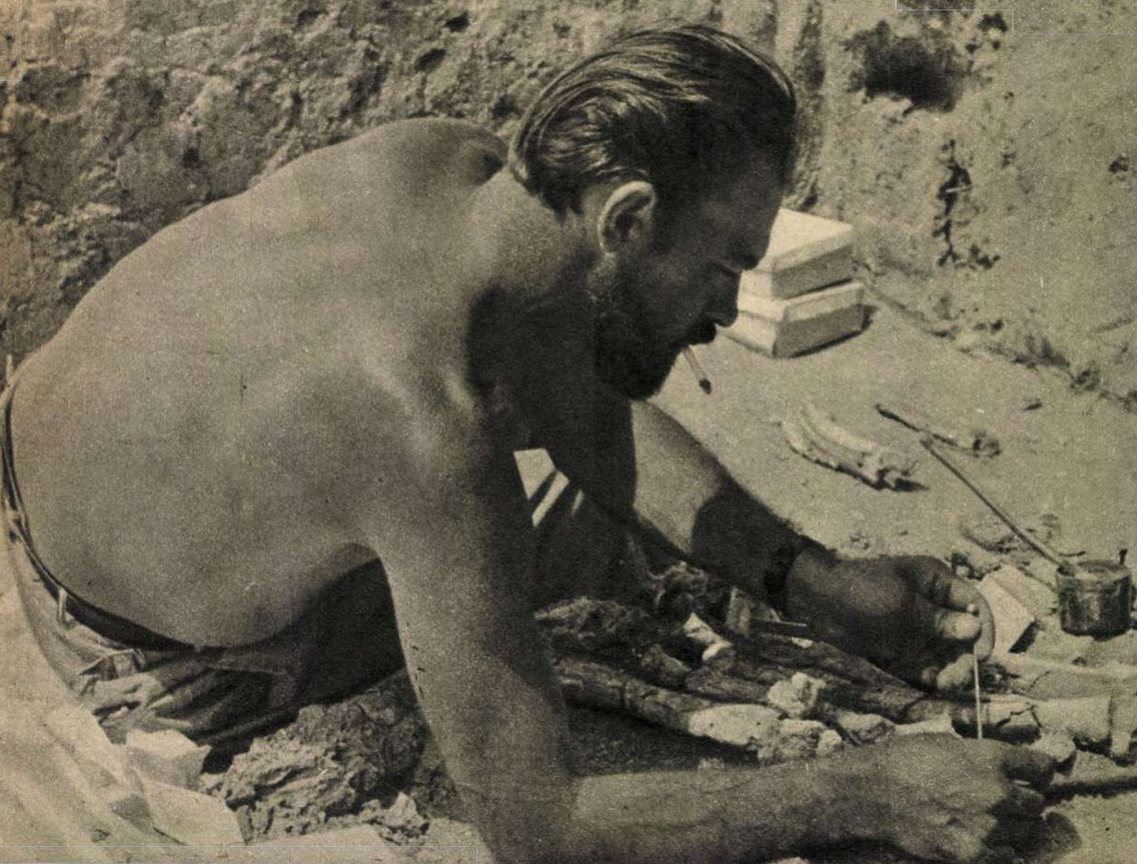
Dardu Nicolăescu-Plopșor excavating in Bugiulești, c. June 1960. Photograph by Grigore Avakian

During his final years Nicolăescu-Plopșor worked at Ada Kaleh, an island on the Danube which housed an isolated Turkish-Romanian and Islamic community. The site was supposed to be flooded upon the completion of the Đerdap dam (a Romanian–Yugoslav joint venture), and Plopșor's team were mapping out a plan to transfer the historical buildings up on the Romanian shore. He completed his last work of literature, Tivisoc și Tivismoc ("Tivisoc and Tivismoc"), of which two chapters were published in 1964. The full book appeared in 1965 at Editura Tineretului, with illustrations by Mihu Vulcănescu and a circulation of 130,000 copies. A feature-length cartoon version was considered by Animafilm in 1966, and Nicolăescu-Plopșor wrote the screenplay; also that year, Frăsina Vlad, the award-winning naive artist, exhibited a cycle of paintings directly inspired by Tivisoc și Tivismoc.

Also heading the Academy's Institute of Philology and Ethnography in 1966–1968, Nicolăescu-Plopșor received there the new Communist General Secretary, Nicolae Ceaușescu, who was touring Oltenia Region in June 1966. Addressing his guest, Plopșor spoke "of the activity and the tasks set for men of science", in particular at the Institute. By then, he himself had been drafted into the Communist Party. Plopșor spent the latter part of his life in Blocul albastru, a housing estate on Craiova's 24 Februarie Street. With fellow intellectuals such as Petre Pandrea, Vasile Georgescu Paleolog and Stelian Cincă, he took part in literary sessions organized by the Oltenian magazine, Ramuri, having been a contributor from its first issue of this new edition, appearing in August 1964. From early 1965, he also served on Ramuri's editorial board, alongside Constant, Ilie Purcaru, Sina Dănciulescu and Petre Dragu.

The embryonic University of Craiova employed Nicolăescu-Plopșor as the chair of history; he supported the creation of museums in Corabia and Orlea. He was also revealed as a philatelist: in January 1968, he exhibited his collection at the Craiova Philately Exhibit, and won a medal for his contribution. He worked for a while in Coțofenii din Față, helping to rescue the local manor, and dating some of its walls to the late-15th century. He had by then dedicated himself to the localization of sites referred to in historical sources, such as the Daco-Roman city of Malva. He maintained that its ruins were to be found in the Dolj area of Fălcoiu, contrary to both Vasile Pârvan's Brădești and later consensus about Malva and Romula being one and the same locality. According to Pandrea, in 1966–1968 he directed the acquisition of 160,000 volumes by the Craiova branch of the Academy, mostly by channeling private donations for this cause.

Constant met Nicolăescu-Plopșor one final time in early 1968, at Craiova. The archeologist was by then visibly troubled by an "undisclosed physical suffering"; he had intended to set up a new edition of Arhivele Olteniei, but realized that ho could no longer see to such projects. Plopșor died on May 30, 1968, in Bucharest, reportedly "while under a surgeon's knife, on the hospital table." His body was laid in state at the Archaeology Institute. It was taken to Craiova, and again displayed at the local section of the Academy, then taken for burial at Sineasca Cemetery (both events on June 2). In the immediate aftermath, his folklorist disciples Aurelian I. Popescu and Ștefan Bossun had a publicized dispute, with the latter accusing the former of plagiarizing from their teacher, and of contributing inferior versions of poems already collected by Plopșor; Popescu denied that this was the case. At the time, Bossun also reported that death had stopped the academician from publishing all his collected ballads, and also that he was preparing an anthology of Oltenian writers, and a bibliography of Oltenian periodicals.

== Archaeology and anthropology ==
=== Early activities ===
The beginnings of Constantin S. Nicolăescu-Plopșor's archaeological and paleoanthropological investigations were closely linked to his interest in uncovering Oltenian manifestations of Balkan prehistory. He cited as his immediate predecessors a small group of amateur historians, among them Magnus Băileanu and a schoolteacher by the name of Calloianu. In supporting his own theory that ancient Oltenians had an Asian origin, Nicolăescu-Plopșor speculated on the basis of biological anthropology and anthropometry, suggesting that both the original Asian population and 20th-century inhabitants had the same cephalic index. He also concluded that the region almost completely lacked human presence during the Paleolithic (a matter which he tentatively attributed to the harsh Pleistocene climate) and debated such assessments with fellow archaeologist Márton Roska. Nicolăescu-Plopșor also contested the conclusions of Ceslav Ambrojevici regarding a Middle Paleolithic (Micoquien) presence in the eastern areas of Bessarabia region, suggesting, like others after him, that Ambrojevici had produced a flawed stratigraphy. He did however produce an isolated opinion in respect to the Peștera Oilor remains, proposing that the Oltenian site dated back to the Paleolithic. Plopșor centered his review of the Middle Paleolithic, and in particular the Mousterian archaeological industry, on the discoveries made further north, in Transylvania, by Nicolae N. Moroșan. In relation to this subject, he theorized the existence of a particular Transylvanian trait: the supposed lack of flint, as an explanation for the proliferation of quartzite and bone Mousterian tools. In his initial verdicts on the Upper Paleolithic, Plopșor followed a tendency common among scholars of his day, believing the Szeletian to be a manifestation of the Solutrean in Hungary and Transylvania, and saw both industries as related to the Aurignacian.

The research into măguri prompted Nicolăescu-Plopșor to draw a comparison with the Mesolithic køkkenmødding sites of Northern Europe, which he linked with the practice of hunting and fishing, whereas the Oltenian locations evidenced a lifestyle related to agriculture and herding. His investigation of the Mesolithic sites and his report on the Plopoșorian and Cleanovian as possibly distinct industries were criticized by Moroșan, who placed such discoveries in connection with Stone Age sites in Poland and France's Tardenoisian sites. Similarly, his definition of remains found at Peștera Hoților, near Băile Herculane, as Azilian was disputed by fellow archaeologist Dumitru Berciu, who regarded them as early Neolithic. Nicolăescu-Plopșor also focused on objects he identified as Neolithic (such as a statue and a stone hatchet), while commenting on the function of linear and other forms of pottery (postulating that, given the spread of mixed techniques, the potter's wheel was not perceived as an immediate technological advance) and the supposed attestation of Neolithic childhood games (including his theory that pierced and intact bone objects of uncertain use were an early version of knucklebones). In his study of cave paintings, Plopșor listed images he believed were representations of men and a solar motif, and theorized the existence of a Sun cult. Overall, he concluded, there was an autonomous "Oltenian cave art", which shared some traits with but was unrelated to that of Prehistoric Iberia, while being seemingly connected to representations in Magura Cave, Bulgaria.

In time, the Romanian archaeologist developed his own systems for subdividing prehistoric eras in an Oltenian context. Starting from the observation that Iron-Age Dacian communities displayed a lifestyle similar to Neolithic patterns, and reducing protohistory to a sharp divide between archaeological evidence and the first written records, he concluded that, in Oltenia's case, "prehistory" extended throughout the Roman administration and down to a period conventionally included in the Early Middle Ages. His texts offered personalized and dialectical alternatives to the since-standardized names, such as vârsta acioaiei instead of epoca bronzului ("Bronze Age", acioaiei being an archaism), vârsta cavalerilor ("knight age") for epoca migrațiilor ("Age of Migrations") etc. His division of the Paleolithic closely followed the principles of Joseph Déchelette, with references to archaeological industries between the Chellean and the Magdalenian.

=== Late contributions ===
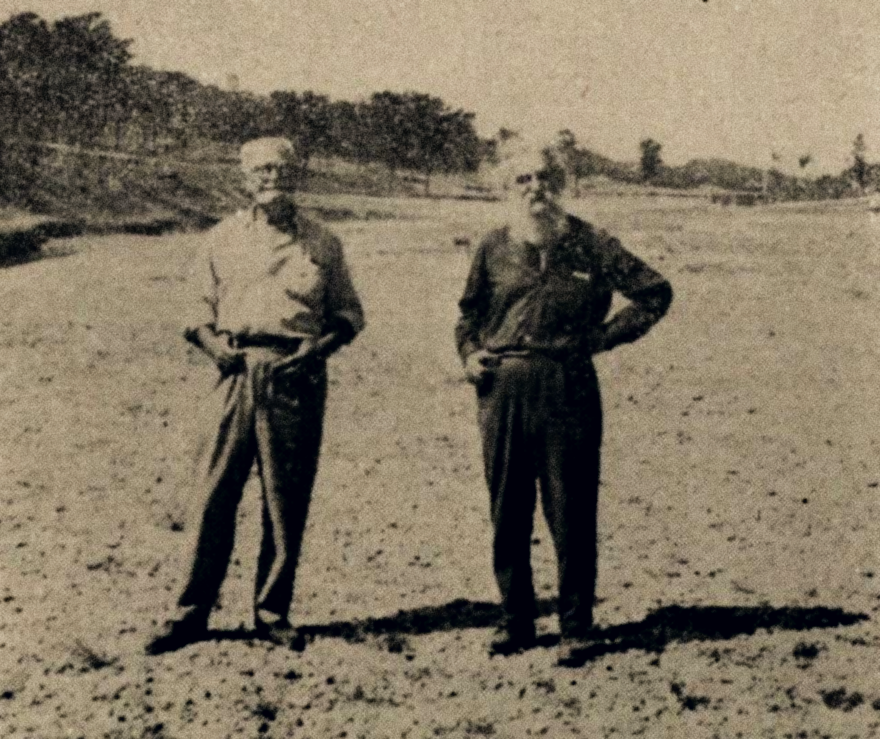
Nicolăescu-Plopșor (on the right) and his colleague I. N. Moroșan on the Dârjov banks in Olt County, investigating a site attributed to the "pebble culture"

By the early 1960s, the new discoveries of Paleolithic remains prompted Nicolăescu-Plopșor to review his general conclusions. At the time, he came to argue that the Romanian Paleolithic began with a "pebble culture" (cultura de prund), or Eopaleolithic, which preceded Archeopaleolithic (between Chellean and Clactonian), Mesopaleolithic (Levalloisian and Upper Mousterian), Acropaleolithic (Aurignacian and Kostenkian), Epipaleolithic (Azilian and Swiderian), and Preneolithic. In 1965 he had modified the scale to include the discoveries at Tetoiu (Bugiulești, Valea lui Grăunceanu), which he attributed to an initial, Prepaleolithic, age. In tandem, Nicolăescu-Plopșor took personal part in reassessing the Pleistocene and Neanderthal presence in Romania. His Bordul Mare expedition uncovered fossilized Neanderthal and game remains, as well as a characteristic hearth.

With his reassessment of earlier theories came the assessment that the supposed australopithecine in the Tetoiu area used stones collected from great distances in carving out the carcasses of large animals—leading Nicolăescu-Plopșor to postulate that Tetoiu was a link between the australopithecine sites on three continents, evidencing "the oldest stages in the process of conscious work." A collateral implication of Nicolăescu-Plopșor's discovery, based on stratigraphy, was the claim that Oltenia had a contribution to anthropogenesis alongside the Oldowan complex uncovered in Tanzania by Louis Leakey. Such theories were viewed with reserve by his contemporaries, and accepted only as a hypothesis by the archaeological mainstream of the 1970s. Archaeologist Paul I. Dicu described the "Prepaleolithic" as an "ambiguous term", and as "nonsense" when applied to the "pebble culture". Among Nicolăescu-Plopșor's critics in this respect is another archaeologist, Adrian Doboș, who creates an analogy with flawed deductions made about an archaeological industry existing at Makapansgat (conclusions which Nicolăescu-Plopșor himself cited as a precedent). Plopșor was also criticized as a "dilettante" by another researcher, Ion Nestor—though Petre Pandrea contents that Nestor was motivated by jealousy.

During the late 1950s, Nicolăescu-Plopșor was prompted by new discoveries made in the Pestișu Mic area to revisit his take on the Szeletian, which he came to view as a manifestation of the Mousterian and the inaugural industry of the Upper Paleolithic. This claim was reviewed a final time in 1966, when he concluded that the Szeletian did not exist east of Hungary. Other discoveries from Western Moldavia led him to designate Aurignacian, Kostenkian and Gravettian industries, primarily characterized by a type of flint deemed "of the Prut River". By the 1950s, he had arrived to the conclusion that the Mesolithic age was not an independent phenomenon, but rather a late form of the Magdalenian leading into the Neolithic. Doboș however notes that this was not an absolute conclusion, and that later texts show Nicolăescu-Plopșor contradicting himself in describing a Mesolithic "gradual transition" and the Epipaleolithic as "more or less: a delayed Paleolithic". Also according to Doboș, the researcher synthesized his opinion only in 1965, when he defined the Mesolithic as applicable only to those microlithic sites that stood "for a natural transition" toward the Neolithic, while arguing that no such examples could be found in Romania.

During the final two decades of Nicolăescu-Plopșor's activity, he adopted a controversial approach to naming and classifying local cultures, prioritizing Soviet and Eastern-Bloc scholarship in accordance with the communist regime's ideological requirements. In 1954, he celebrated Soviet historiography for "thoroughly" investigating the Paleolithic from a global perspective, and ridiculed Western approaches as reductionist. Focusing his attention on claims made by some Western researchers, who argued that Chellean industries were superior to Clactonian ones for supposedly racial reasons, Nicolăescu-Plopșor accused his colleagues of scientific racism, and indicated that Chellean and Clactonian industries occasionally developed in the same areas. The Romanian scholar primarily designated local Gravettian sites as Kostenkian, after the Soviet model, and generally renounced mentioning industries under their Western names. He also spoke in favor of replacing neologisms coined for specific items in prehistoric typology with adaptations from the Romanian lexis. For example, he recommended following 19th-century researcher Cezar Bolliac in designating industrial nuclei as mătci ("sources" or "wombs").

== Literature ==
=== Stylistic traits ===
Nicolăescu-Plopșor's occasional and attributed piece Ghilabos ăl rom ghilabos is praised by philologist Viktor Shapoval as "an extraordinary song, which presents a modernist, concise poetry with lack of a punctuation, and written in capital letters. At the same time, it can be seen as a prayer filled with biblical imagery." He was most often praised for his work in prose, being seen by fellow author Adrian Maniu as a "wild talent" of "those meadows found west of the Olt". According to Aurelian I. Popescu, his contribution is divided into two categories: the "exact collection" of folkloric records and the reworking of folkloric themes through the original interventions and expansions of a "great storyteller". The latter function saw Nicolăescu-Plopșor replicating the example of Ion Creangă, a 19th-century storyteller culturally linked to old Moldavia, and brought him the nickname of "Oltenian Creangă".

Cioculescu believes that Nicolăescu-Plopșor closely matches Creangă's outlook as a humorist, and also relies heavily on dialect—in his case, the Oltenian one. The heavy use of dialectal patterns was found off-putting by others. Writing about Plopșor's La struguri in 1925, author Ion Dongorozi advised him to refrain from overemphasizing his Dolj-based regionalism in his fiction, as he was no longer documenting folkloric usage. Also that year, scholar Nicolae Iorga allowed Nicolăescu-Plopșor to publish one of his tales in Ramuri, but also complained the text was too laden with dialectal terms, and lacked a narrative structure. According to Iorga, Plopșor had displayed no "loving hand" in transcribing the source material. Ethnologist Alexandru Leca Morariu believes that Plopșor's dialectal writing is sometimes overdone and distasteful, "obscuring the meaning of phrases". He likens the effect with that produced by dialectal stories by the older Barbu Ștefănescu Delavrancea, noting that neither author reached Creangă's inherent skills.

Such works require a glossary of regional terms, including for the titular term ceaùr ("woozy", in reference to a drunken mouse that picks on his feline persecutor), the noun hat ("horse"), and the unusual noun phrase pietre nestimândre ("gemstones", for which standard Romanian uses nestemate). Plopșor also employs uncommon verbs, including a mitocosi ("to bewilder") and a scredi ("to overcook"), as well as the adjective buzgur (introducing a Romanian version of the bogeyman). The usage of real-life peasant expressions, regional or pan-Romanian, extends to elaborate catchphrases (își bagă nasul unde nu-i fierbe oala, "he puts his nose where his pot's not boiling", as in: "he does not mind his own business"; chip-nechip, "face or no face"—"by hook or by crook"), self-contradicting augmentative diminutives (cât îi ziulica de lungă, "the full length of a little day", expressly intended to mean "the longer part of the day"), and interjections appearing as verbs (iacătă și ursul, "hop! the bear"). In the Ceaùr cycle, Morariu detects numerous terms only found in Oltenian and Istro-Romanian: arâmbașa / harambașa for a hajduk commander, amânat used for "belated", besedie for "nonsense talk", the prefix ză- used for verbs, and the preservation of quaint grammatical tenses.

The main product of Nicolăescu-Plopșor's creative storytelling is Tivisoc și Tivismoc, but the category also includes a version of the Iovan Iorgovan stories and a fairy tale titled Cotoșman împărat ("Emperor Tomcat"). As argued by Morariu, the latter is in fact a fable, with none of the narratives in Ceaùr actually fitting the descriptor as "tales" or "stories"; as he notes, Plopșor's contribution as an author is "evidently manifest" in his scholarly commentary, scene descriptions and modern expressions (including at least one borrowing from Alecu Donici), all of which were added over the source material. Other works of the series are entirely done in his hand, and reflect his direct experience of rural life—according to Morariu, they belong to the sketch story genre. In such pieces, he occasionally signed himself with the pen name Moș Plopșor, tartorul poveștilor ("Old Man Plopșor, ringleader of the stories"). In various places, the author explained his method in figures of speech, with a children's rhyme:

După ușe, într-o ladă,
Stau poveștile grămadă
Și-n hodaie, pe sub pat,
Mai am înc-un sac legat;
De bag mâna-n săcăteu,
Ies poveștile mereu.

Translation:

Behind the door, inside a chest,
That is where all them stories nest
And in the room, under the bed,
I have a sack that's tied instead;
So if I push my hand into the bag,
Them stories grab on it; I drag.

=== Tivisoc și Tivismoc ===
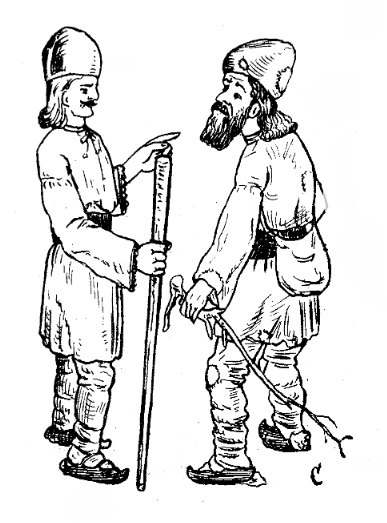
Păcală (left) in a 1907 anonymous illustration

The series of anecdotes about Tivisoc and Tivismoc stands out among Nicolăescu-Plopșor's contributions as a spin-off of the popular Păcală folktales. Cerna-Rădulescu describes the book as an "ambitious attempt to complete a folk novel", as well as an idirect proof that absurdist fiction, as embodied in modern times by Urmuz and Eugène Ionesco, "has its roots planted in Romanian folklore". The two eponymous protagonists are "unborn children" to Păcală, an irreverent and often ingenious peasant whose exploits are an established presence in Romanian humor and early Romanian literature. The writer defined his own text as "a bundle of crafted stories, garnished here and there with lies", and "a new story, from older, forgotten stories". His technique, Popescu assessed, "penetrates the world of Păcală, which it enlarges and deepens with a new yarn, the marriage of the famous folk hero." The "unborn" protagonists, who take turns recounting the anecdote pieces as first-person narratives, are original creations of Nicolăescu-Plopșor, their names being nonsensical counting rhymes for the word loc ("place", as in stai pe loc, "stand your ground" or "you're it"). This replication of childlore, Popescu argues, "suggests a certain closeness to the [children's] mentality and ways of understanding".

The narrative builds mainly on absurdist imagery and puns, resulting in what Popescu calls "dense humor". The two brothers mirror each other's physical attributes, and are unrealistically grotesque in appearance: they display heterochromia and hemihypertrophy, their faces and feet being orientated backwards. Rejecting the prospects of being born to a priest or even a nobleman (the Ban of Craiova), they opt instead for Păcală, who is depicted as a destitute peasant from Vaideei (a village in the commune of Romos, now in Hunedoara County). The location was chosen for its humorous connotations, which, Popescu notes, had already made it the target of "innocent jokes [...] in Oltenian folklore": the name breaks into vai de ei, "woe to them". The village is depicted by Plopșor as a place in which poverty is met with self-irony, resulting in absurd jokes. For example, a Vaideeni man deplores the loss of a pear, stolen from his yard by a sparrow, because he intended to use its fibrous tail as a "cart axle".

Scholar Victor Crăciun notes that Tivisoc și Tivismoc is in part a retelling of the Păcală stories, as picked up from Iosif Nădejde and Petre Dulfu, "with a more pronounced social atmosphere, and giving them a more pronounced basis in Oltenian folklore." The ethnographic overview of Oltenia is complemented by a depiction of the region's southern parts, through an account of Păcală's trip through Craiova and down to the Danube. The episode allows for retrospective social criticism of peasant life as it supposedly was during the Romanian Kingdom period, with references to the 1907 revolt and quotes from Radu of Giubega. Plopșor's account also offers room for self-irony and satire of the Oltenian ethos, an attribute traditionally stereotyped as obtuse pride: the supposed Oltenian reaction to the introduction of a railway system is an attempt at derailing the trains with lures of maize. The same section includes jokes about Caracal town, commonly ridiculed in local folklore as the place where the cart transporting imbeciles "tumbled over", and mentions in passing the legend of Caracal's fire lookout tower, which was supposedly lost to flames. Such accounts, Popescu wrote, form "an important source of information for ethnographers and folklorists".

The main part of the story, in which the focus is on Tivisoc and Tivismoc, sees the unborn boys accompanying their future father on a quest to find a suitable mother, and later their trip to the mill, where they seem prone to do all things backwards and manage to literally lose their own heads (having to recover them from hungry dogs). The real adventure starts when birds transport them to Scaunu dreptății ("The Seat of Justice"), a mock version of the Last Judgment, which provides the setting for anticlerical jokes and satire of Christian mythology: God is depicted as aging and incompetent, Jesus as a young man "dozing off and scratching his thin beard", Mary as "a middle-aged woman with blue, terrified eyes". The two boys intervene to stop the lesser devils from pulling on the scales to send more people into Hell, but are upset to note that God himself is inclined to pardon a swindling tavern-keeper because he had not kept tabs on a priest. Saint Peter allows the two boys to bribe their way into Heaven, whose human population has been driven to disgust by the endless supply of milk and mămăligă—while in there, they repeat the story of Adam and Eve and taste unpalatable fruit from the Tree of Knowledge. The weight of this sin drags them into Hell, but they are able to easily impress the naïve devils, and eventually drive them away by burning some frankincense (an illustration of the Romanian expression a fugi ca dracul de tămâie, "to run away like a devil from frankincense").

Once in charge of Hell, Tivisoc and Tivismoc free all categories of folk heroes who are also sinners, primarily hajduks and other celebrated brigands, but, Popescu notes, display Păcală's mix of "intelligence and stupidity" in planning their getaway: the entire group follows the two boys up a rope of sand. After a seven-year climb takes them back to the mill, they redirect the river to flow back into Hell, and manage to drown the returning devils. There follows a reunion with Păcală, his legendary wedding to a woman selected by Tivisoc and Tivismoc, and the boys' eventual birth and reluctant baptism. Although they receive a human appearance, Tivisoc and Tivismoc still display supernatural attributes (such as consuming "fried chicken and garlic" instead of maternal milk). The story ends with their departure into the wild world, and the prospects of more adventures—possibly a second volume, which Plopșor never began writing.

== Legacy ==
The academician was survived by three children. A daughter, Stanca (known in full as Mira Stanca), had won Craiova's beauty contest at age seventeen. She was just graduating from the Grigorescu Institute as a professional sculptor at the time of his death. Dardu Nicolăescu-Plopșor died in Craiova on June 8, 1989, being survived by his brother Ion, an engineer, and Stanca; Ion himself died just three days after. His father's memory had by then been honored with his inclusion into an anthology of Oltenian writers, put out by Florea Firan in 1975. The scholar's death put a stop to conservation efforts at Ada Kaleh, and caused the communist authorities to approve a plan with minimal investment in this area. Controversy has traditionally surrounded the supposed australopithecine sites investigated by Nicolăescu-Plopșor. According to the Cambridge University's Ancient History collection of 1982, his theories regarding Tetoiu were "still open to question." Historian and journalist Vasile Surcel reported in 2009 that these locations had not been revisited by any Romanian archaeologist after the 1960s. Surcel claims: "Instead of continuing his research, his colleagues have preferred to ignore or quite simply not comment on it."

Early portraits of Constantin Nicolăescu-Plopșor include a cartoon by Nicolae Drăgulescu-Drag, first exhibited in Craiova in 1924. Before 1987, a bust of the scholar, done by Anton Barbu Panaghia, had been placed on permanent exhibit at the Craiova center for social sciences. Following the December 1989 Revolution and the end of communism, as part of a larger trend to provide communes with individual coats of arms, Sălcuța chose to be represented by a golden quill and ink bottle, in honor of its native son. By 2004, the commune's rapidly expanding Romani population was being blamed by Georgică Pîslan, the mayoral secretary, on Plopșor's colonization projects; Pîslan noted that he was not interested in learning Romani, though he kept one copy of Ghileà romanè, left to him by the Nicolăescu-Plopșor family. The industrial high school in Plenița bears the scholar's name, as Grupul Școlar Industrial Constantin Nicolăescu-Plopșor—since the late 1990s, it was reportedly struggling with truancy and theft. Plopșor's name was also given to the former 24 Februarie Street in Craiova, which was also home to an eponymous circle of humorists, led by Valentin Smarand Popescu.

In 1999, the Academy and the University of Craiova set up the C. S. Nicolăescu-Plopșor Socio-Human Research Institute, which publishes a yearbook of interdisciplinary studies. The Museum of Oltenia holds a special Nicolăescu-Plopșor collection, which includes his book manuscripts and published works, as well as his correspondence with fellow intellectuals such as Dumitru Berciu, Constantin Daicoviciu and Ion Nestor. In late 1995, a campaign was mounted for the museum to also purchase a large collection of Romanian icons once owned by the scholar; also then, a new edition of Gând și Slovă Oltenească was launched in Craiova.

The scholar's thirtieth commemoration in May 1998 was central to a festival in Sălcuța, with Stanca's participation—and with commemorative plaques prepared for local landmarks. Plopșor's centennial in 2000 was marked by Craiova's National Liberals, with contributions from the University of Craiova. As noted by the local newspaper Gazeta de Sud, the atmosphere was "utterly parochial", largely due to "long speeches and a mystification trend"; the same source noted that a message received from President Emil Constantinescu had mistakenly rendered Plopșor's first name as "Nicolae". Over the following years, another controversy erupted over his role in recovering the Brâncuși sculptures. Paul Rezeanu, who took charge of the items for the Craiova Art Museum, claimed that they had been originally recovered in innocuous circumstances. This was disputed by art critic Cătălin Davidescu, who argued that Rezeanu's claims were unverifiable, and that the cover-up risked tarnishing Plopșor's reputation.
