= Sasu (disambiguation) =

Sasu may refer to the following places:

- Sasu, a tributary of the Botiza in Romania
- Sasu (Strei), a tributary of the Strei in Romania
- Sasu, a tributary of the Izvor in Romania
- Sasul, a tributary of the Lotrioara in Sibiu County, Romania
- Sasu Station, a railway station in North Korea
- Sasu River (Korea) - river in Korea
- Société par actions simplifiée
- Marius Sasu
- Mircea Sasu
- Niculina Sasu
- Sanctioned Suicide, internet forum

== See also ==
- Sas (disambiguation)
- Sașa (disambiguation)
- Șasa (disambiguation)
