= Budele =

- Location within Romania

Location
- Country: Romania
- Counties: Vâlcea County
- Villages: Budele, Sășcioara

Physical characteristics
- Mouth: Olteț
  - location: Zătreni
  - coordinates: 44.7721°N 23.8598°E
- Length: 16 km (9.9 mi)
- Basin size: 46 km^{2} (18 sq mi)

Basin features
- Progression: Olteț→ Olt→ Danube→ Black Sea
- Tributaries
  - right: Sășcioara

The Budele is a left tributary of the river Olteț in Romania. It flows into the Olteț in Zătreni. Its length is 16 km (9.9 mi) and its basin size is 46 km^{2} (18 sq mi).
