= Lăcusteni =

- Commune
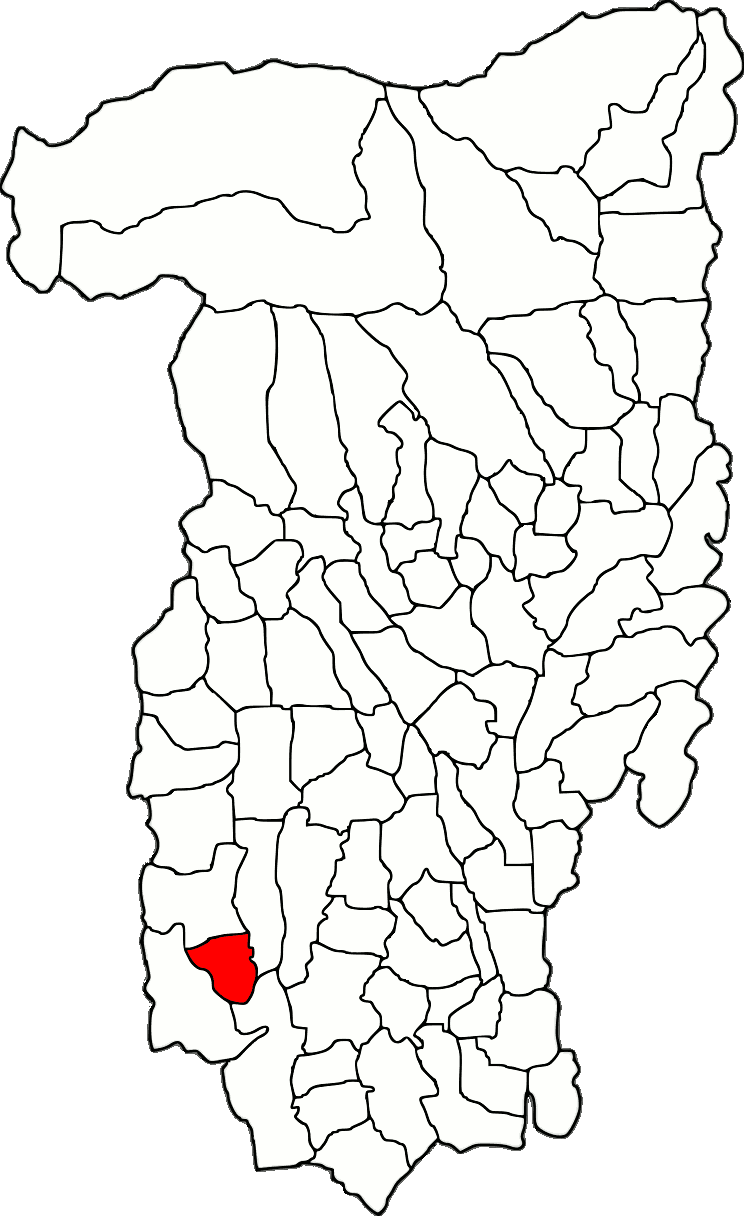
- Location in Vâlcea County

- Location in Romania
- Coordinates: 44°42′N 23°54′E
- Country: Romania
- County: Vâlcea

Government
  - Mayor (2020–2024): Cosmin Bocșaru (PSD)
- Area: 31.15 km^{2} (12.03 sq mi)
- Elevation: 212 m (696 ft)
- Population (2021-12-01): 1,196
  - Density: 38/km^{2} (99/sq mi)
- Time zone: EET/EEST (UTC+2/+3)
- Postal code: 247758
- Area code: +(40) 250
- Vehicle reg.: VL
- Website: lacusteni.ro

Lăcusteni is a commune located in Vâlcea County, Oltenia, Romania. It is composed of five villages: Contea, Gănești, Lăcusteni, Lăcustenii de Jos, and Lăcustenii de Sus. Until 2004, these were part of Zătreni Commune, but were split off to form a separate commune.

== Geography ==
The commune is situated in the Wallachian Plain, at an altitude of 212 m (696 ft), on the banks of the river Olteț and its left tributary, the river Șasa. It is located in the southwestern part of Vâlcea County, 45 km (28 mi) west of the city of Drăgășani and 80 km (50 mi) southwest of the county seat, Râmnicu Vâlcea. Its neighbors are Zătreni commune to the north, Tetoiu commune to the northeast, the town of Bălcești to the south, and Ghioroiu commune to the southwest.
