= Marin Voinea =

Romanian footballer (1935–2021)

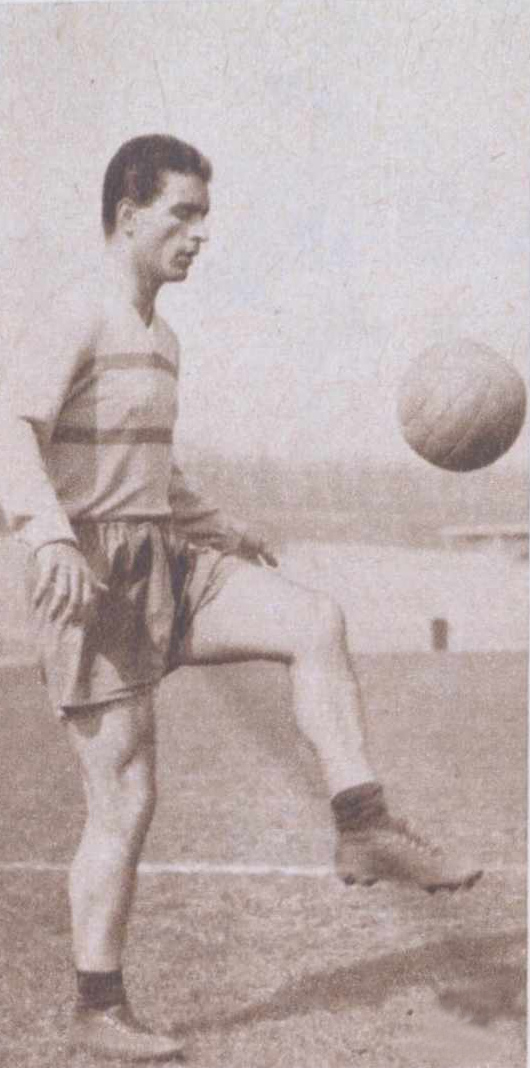

Personal information
- Date of birth: 11 September 1935
- Place of birth: Zătreni, Romania
- Date of death: 19 April 2021 (aged 85)
- Place of death: Bucharest, Romania
- Height: 1.74 m (5 ft 9 in)
- Position: Forward

Senior career*
Years	Team	Apps	(Gls)
1960	Granitul București		
1961–1964	Progresul București	88	(29)
1965–1966	Siderurgistul Galați (Note: The statistics for the Divizia B 1964–65 season are unavailable.)	18	(11)
1966–1967	Metalurgistul București		
Total		106	(40)

International career
1962	Romania	3	(2)
- * Club domestic league appearances and goals

Marin Voinea (11 September 1935 – 19 April 2021) was a Romanian footballer who played as a forward.

== Club career ==
Voinea, nicknamed "Cărămidă" (Brick), was born on 11 September 1935 in Zătreni, Romania and began playing football in 1960 at Divizia C club Granitul București. Shortly afterwards he moved to Progresul București where he made his Divizia A debut on 9 April 1961 under coach Ioan Lupaș in a 1–0 away loss to Minerul Lupeni. He scored a personal record of 14 goals which helped the club finish in third place in the 1961–62 season. In the same season he played in both legs of the 2–1 aggregate loss to Leixões in the preliminary round of the European Cup Winners' Cup. In the middle of the 1964–65 season, Voinea left Progresul to join Divizia B club, Siderurgistul Galați which he helped earn promotion to the first league. In the following season he made his last Divizia A appearance on 12 June 1966 in Siderurgistul's 4–1 away loss to Universitatea Cluj, totaling 106 matches with 40 goals in the competition. Voinea ended his career one year later at Divizia B club Metalurgistul București.

== International career ==
Voinea played three games for Romania, making his debut on 30 September 1962, scoring two goals under coach Constantin Teașcă in a 4–0 friendly victory against Morocco. His last appearance for the national team occurred on 1 November 1962 in a 6–0 loss to Spain in the 1964 European Nations' Cup qualifiers.

=== International goals ===
Scores and results list Romania's goal tally first, score column indicates score after each Voinea goal.

List of international goals scored by Marin Voinea
#	Date	Venue	Cap	Opponent	Score	Result	Competition
1	30 September 1962	23 August Stadium, București, Romania	1	Morocco	1–0	4–0	Friendly
2	30 September 1962	23 August Stadium, București, Romania	1	Morocco	4–0	4–0	Friendly

== Personal life ==
His nephew, Marcel Răducanu, was also a footballer.

== Death ==
Voinea died on 19 April 2021 at the age of 85.

== Honours ==
Siderurgistul Galați

- Divizia B: 1964–65
