= Zătreni =

- Commune
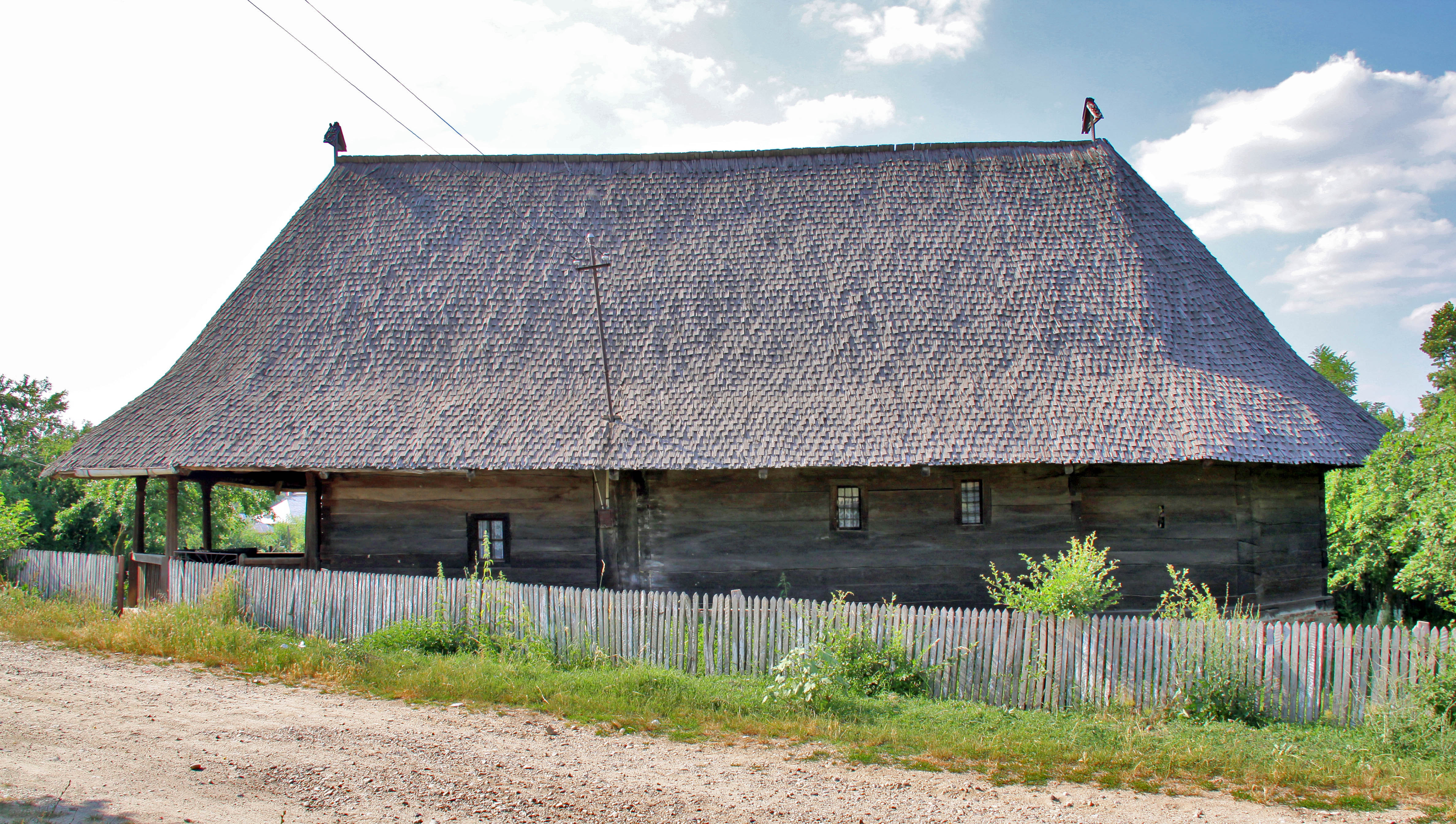
- Wooden church in Zătreni

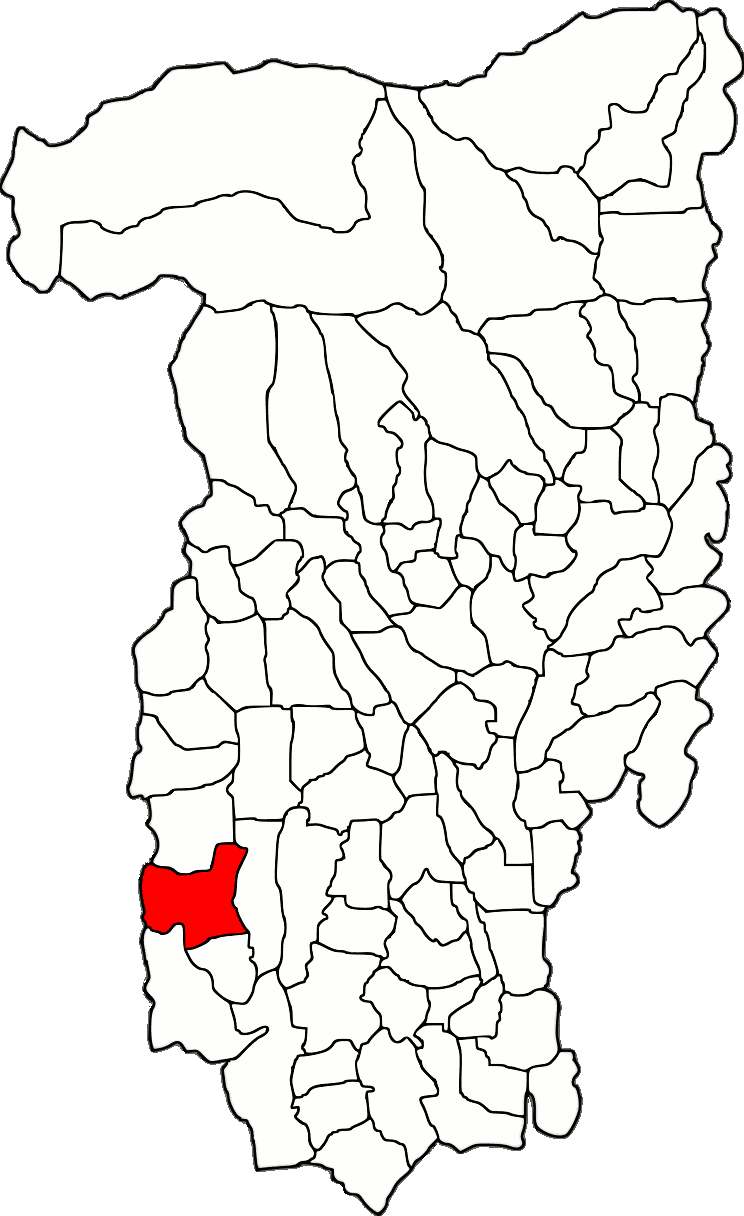
- Location in Vâlcea County

- Location in Romania
- Coordinates: 44°46′N 23°51′E
- Country: Romania
- County: Vâlcea

Government
  - Mayor (2020–2024): Constantin I. Lițoiu (PSD)
- Area: 78.93 km^{2} (30.48 sq mi)
- Elevation: 235 m (771 ft)
- Population (2021-12-01): 1,934
  - Density: 24.50/km^{2} (63.46/sq mi)
- Time zone: UTC+02:00 (EET)
  - Summer (DST): UTC+03:00 (EEST)
- Postal code: 247755
- Area code: +(40) 250
- Vehicle reg.: VL
- Website: www.primariazatreni.ro

Zătreni is a commune located in Vâlcea County, Oltenia, Romania. It is composed of fourteen villages: Butanu, Ciortești, Dealu Glămeia, Dealu Văleni, Făurești, Mănicea, Mecea, Oltețu, Sășcioara, Stanomiru, Valea Văleni, Văleni, Zătreni, and Zătrenii de Sus. Until 2004, it also included Contea, Gănești, Lăcusteni, Lăcustenii de Jos and Lăcustenii de Sus villages; these were split off that year to form Lăcusteni Commune.

The commune is situated on the Getic Plateau, at an altitude of 235 m (771 ft), on the banks of the river Olteț and its left tributary, the Budele. It is located in the southwestern part of Vâlcea County, 20 km (12 mi) north of Bălcești and 75 km (47 mi) southwest of the county seat, Râmnicu Vâlcea, on the border with Gorj County.

Zătreni is crossed by national road DN67B, which leads to Târgu Jiu, 86 km (53 mi) to the northwest, and Drăgășani, 58 km (36 mi) to the southeast.

The commune features Cula Zătreanu, dating from 1754.

== Natives ==
- Marin Voinea (1935 – 2021), footballer
