= Mihail Moxa =

Wallachian historiographer and Orthodox monk

Mihail Moxa (Romanian pronunciation: [mihaˈil ˈmoksa], Cyrillic: Михаил Мoѯа; also known as Moxalie, and originally named Vasile Moxa; after 1550 – before 1650) was a Wallachian historiographer, translator, and Orthodox monk. Associated with the Oltenia region (the western third of old Wallachia), he lived for much of his life at Bistrița Monastery; his career spanned a moment of deep political subjugation to the Ottoman Empire, to which he, as a historian, opposed an early version of Romanian nationalism. Moxa was one of the first authors to champion the usage of Romanian as a literary language, at a time when education (including his own) was done in Old Church Slavonic, which was still the Wallachian court language, or in Greek.

Moxa's universal chronicle, probably the first of its kind in Romanian literature, was closely based on the standards of Byzantine literature, and especially on Constantine Manasses, but veered away to offer his personal musings. These include Moxa's acceptance of heliocentrism, his beliefs about the origin of the Romanians, as well as his praise of heroes in the anti-Ottoman struggles. Moxa's work was overall less accomplished than locally-centered chronicles produced in Moldavia during the previous century—though these were entirely in Slavonic. Completed in 1620, the chronicle is the first of three surviving works by the monk. His output also includes a liturgical book, as well as a legal collection, Pravila, which was commissioned by the Wallachian Prince Matei Basarab. The latter is also the only one of his contributions to have been printed in his lifetime; the chronicle, preserved in three manuscripts, was only published in fragmentary form after 1845, and as a complete edition in 1942.

== Biography and written work ==
Moxa's entire life overlapped with Wallachia and Moldavia's subjugation by the Ottomans—a client-state status that he himself deeply resented. Nothing is known about the Moxa family, though it is believed that Mihail was from the Oltenia region, since he became a monk at Bistrița, in the Archdiocese of Râmnic. Archimandrite Veniamin Micle, who supports the theory of his Oltenian origin, also reports that his baptismal name was "Vasile", and that his schooling was personally handled by the local Archbishop, Teofil II—who gave him lessons in theology, history, and law. Within the scientific community, linguist Alexandru Cihac argued that Moxa was not an ethnic Romanian, but rather a man of mixed Russian and Greek ancestry. He disagreed on this issue with historian Bogdan Petriceicu Hasdeu, though the later conceded that Moxa's usage of Romanian seemed to indicate that it was not his native language, and also that the monk was likely educated in Greek. In a 1922 piece, historian Nicolae Iorga hypothesized that he was of Aromanian background. Moxa also had a solid grasp of Slavonic, translating religious texts into Romanian in style that other critics have praised as colorful and fluent.

Moxa compiled the first extant chronicle in Romanian. Written at Teofil's behest, its arrival coincides with the first sustained moves to emancipate Romanian intellectual circles from their traditional reliance on Slavonic. As observed by scholar Laurențiu Vlad, Moxa's work has a chronological table that is near-identical to one used in Moldavia by Peter the Lame, which is dated to 1588—Peter's document is possibly the first time that the people's language was adopted, albeit in a "stereotyped form", for history-writing. According to Iorga, Moxa's contribution, though pioneering, did not manage to compete with the school of Moldavian historiography, which had already produced numerous and original works in Slavonic form. Wallachians lagged far behind, especially since Moxa still would not focus his attention on national history.

Moxa's prologue to his chronicle is itself from 1588; the epilogue (seen by Micle as "outstandingly beautiful") clarifies that it was completed in September 1620. The core text of the book invites debates regarding originality: as literary critic Răzvan Voncu observed in 2021, Moxa was a "compiler", active at a time marked by "the absolute supremacy of imitations and the non-conceptualization of plagiarism." With this in mind, Moxa's is still a late-medieval chronicle of "very good repute". According to Cihac, parts of the text are exact translations from a 12th-century Byzantine chronicle by Manasses. The claim that Moxa had slavishly copied from a retelling of Manasses (in Slavonic prose) was also advanced by bibliologist Nicolae Cartojan, who later corrected himself—identifying other sources that went into Moxa's compilation effort.

Micle similarly suggests that the overall work, which has two sections and 99 chapters, integrated stories from the Old Testament, alongside accounts directly taken from Josephus, Symeon Logothete, Joannes Zonaras, John Chortasmenos, and Euthymius of Tarnovo. Slavist G. Mihăilă identifies six Slavonic or more generally Slavic texts that went into the Romanian synthesis (including one specific translation from Manasses, done in "Middle Bulgarian"), while Vlad, who identifies ten such works, proposes that Josephus was known to Moxa through a Serbian translation. Historian Mihai Berza notes that the bulk of influences were minor Byzantine authors, of the least scholarly variety. According to Berza, these were the sources best liked by the South Slavs, on whom whose influence on Romanian culture was still direct and significant in the 17th century.

Vlad proposes that Moxa's chronicle "breaks the canons of the ecclesiastical texts", being generally eclectic. Moxa remains noted for his original cosmography, one that accepted heliocentrism; according to scholar Barbu Lăzăreanu, this is a likely indication that Moxa had some contact with "subversive" works by Nicolaus Copernicus and Giordano Bruno. The fragment is unusual in that it shows "the God of the Old and New Testaments baptizing His stars with the names of Olympian deities". The chronicle also stands out for its outlier perspective on the origin of the Romanians: throughout the work, Moxa refers to the Roman people not just as ancestors of the Vlachs, but also as themselves "Romanian". He was at least marginally aware of the existing Slavonic historiography in Moldavia, since (as argued by Iorga) he borrowed his dating of the foundation of Moldavia from such sources.

Beyond the Roman–Romanian genealogy, Moxa's ethnic terminology remains obscure: in keeping with the Byzantines' cultivated indifference toward the exact origins of non-Christians, he uses "Turks" to mean Ottomans, but also Parthians, Seljuks, Hungarians, and occasionally Arabs (though the latter are also designated as "Aravs", "Hagarians", and Cărăimani). Moxa's treatment of Byzantine military history includes a series of confusions, which were either present in his sources or were his own misreadings. As such, in depicting the Byzantine–Bulgarian war of 894–896, he wrongly credits the early Hungarians as enemies of the Byzantines; he also seems unaware of Leo VI's being engaged in a parallel war with the Arabs. The monk spreads out his own musings on the Ottoman wars in Europe, praising historical figures such as Mircea the Elder, Stephen the Great and John Hunyadi (or "Iancu Voivode") for their success in curbing the Ottoman encroachment; his chronicle ends with statements on the 1509 Constantinople earthquake, which Moxa regarded as an omen announcing the eventual Ottoman decline.

While Iorga has it that Moxa's chronicle was "sought after in all the Romanian countries", Vlad suggests that the narrative could only ever hope to be read by a "restricted audience". According to Micle, Moxa still managed to elevate the preexisting Bistrița school of copyists and writers, making it into a hub of early Romanian literature. Iorga contends that Moxa may be the uncredited author of a short Wallachian-themed chronicle, which is only preserved in a Latin translation by Franz Xavier de Peyachevich. The monk's other known work includes a liturgical book, or Liturghierul, completed later in the 1620s. His Pravila, a sourcebook of laws, was printed in 1640, at the expense of Prince Matei Basarab, and carries Teofil's explicit blessings. It was closely based on the Byzantine nomocanons, as passed through a Slavonic intermediary, but remains recognized as the "first-ever law book in the country's vernacular." Arranged for print by Meletie Macedoneanul at Govora, Pravila carried a blason by Wallachia's court poet, Udriște Năsturel. It remains the only book by Moxa to have been printed in his immediate cultural setting; three editions appeared, one of them specifically targeting the Orthodox Romanian community in neighboring Transylvania.

== Legacy ==
Moxa's chronicle, which exists in three separate handwritten copies, was only discovered in 1845 by a Russian Slavist, Victor Grigorovich; this version is preserved at the Russian State Library, Moscow. Grigorovich selected the final seven chapters for publication at Kazan, in 1859. This selection was read by the Bulgarian Georgi Sava Rakovski, who then published smaller fragments of the chronicle in the Principality of Serbia. The Moscow manuscript was transcribed by a visiting Romanian historian, Grigore Tocilescu, who presented Hasdeu with his copy. Fragments were first printed in 1878 by Hasdeu, as part of the sourcebook Cuvinte den bătrăni. This version stood out for still using Cyrillic type after the Romanian alphabet had been adopted. It is also believed to have inspired poet Mihai Eminescu in writing Scrisoarea III—or, more specifically, the part of the poem detailing Mircea the Elder's fight against the Ottomans at Rovine.

Hasdeu's effort was followed in 1897 by a reprint of Liturghierul, which had been rediscovered by I. G. Sbiera; the original manuscript is currently preserved by the British Museum, and was studied in 1975 by historian Dennis Deletant. A full edition of the chronicle, handled by N. Simache and Tr. Cristescu, appeared at Buzău in 1942. Almost immediately after, another manuscript of the chronicle, possibly penned in the 18th century by Father Stanciu of Antim Monastery, was uncovered by folklorist Constantin S. Nicolăescu-Plopșor, who then published it in Craiova. Both this version, and another one discovered in 1971 at Iași, seem to rely on a lost manuscript, which is somewhat different from the Moscow artifact. Another complete reprint was done in 1989, with Mihăilă as its curator. It selected the most chronologically accurate manuscript among the three primary ones. A street in central Bucharest, near Calea Victoriei, is called after Moxa. Originally named for Barbu Catargiu, the Communist regime, finding the conservative champion of estate owners unacceptable, replaced him with a chronicler, a less offensive choice.
