= Paul Rezeanu =

Romanian politician

- Born: November 9, 1937; Breaza, Prahova County, Romania
- Died: March 1, 2021 (aged 83); Bucharest, Romania
- Citizenship: Romanian
- Education: University of Bucharest (1964)
- Occupation: Professor of Art History
- Years active: 1970–2021
- Employer: Faculty of Theology in Craiova

Paul Rezeanu (born November 9, 1937, in Breaza, Prahova County, Romania — died March 1, 2021, in Bucharest, Romania) was a Romanian art historian and critic, contemporary art expert, and professor at the University of Craiova. He is best known for his research on the life and work of Romanian sculptor Constantin Brâncuși, who worked in France.

== Biography ==
In 1964, he graduated from the University of Bucharest, Faculty of History. In 1976, he defended his dissertation "Fine Arts in Oltenia (1821-1944)" and received a PhD in history with a specialization in art history. In 1970 he started working as a researcher at the III sector of the History of Art of the Romanian Academy, department in Craiova, In the same year he was appointed and worked until his retirement in 2004 as director of the Craiova Art Museum, then worked as a researcher at the museum (2004–2009). His tenure at the Faculty of Theology in Craiova included the role of lecturer (1994–1998), and later of the university professor (1998–2008), where he taught courses on "History of Art" and "History and Spirituality of Byzantium".

A major focus of Rezianu’s scholarly work was the life and oeuvre of Constantin Brâncuși, which he researched for nearly five decades. He conducted archival work at the Kandinsky Library of the Centre Pompidou in Paris, where he identified previously unpublished information and documentary evidence that led him to revise a number of established interpretations.

Over the course of his Brâncuși scholarship, he became acquainted with several figures closely connected to the sculptor and his legacy, including Natalia Dumitrescu, Sidney Geist, Petru Comarnescu, Milița Petrașcu, Ștefan Georgescu-Gorjan), Irina Codreanu-King, Jeana Brâncuși, Vasile Blendea and Carola Giedion-Welcker. With some of them, notably Dumitrescu and Geist, he maintained longstanding scholarly exchanges on Brâncuși’s work, archives and artistic legacy. This research resulted in a series of publications devoted to Brâncuși.

Since 1982, Rezianu was a member of the Romanian Artists' Union, Section of History and Criticism. He was an expert on Romanian contemporary art and a member of the ICOM-UNESCO, Paris.

Paul Rezianu has more than a thousand published works, of which more than one hundred and twenty are in professional journals. He has also edited more than thirty books on art history and theory, including monographs on cultural phenomena in Oltena. In addition, he published forty brochures for exhibitions from France, the United States, Germany, Italy, Great Britain, Spain, and other countries that took place in Craiova. He is the author of the History of Fine Arts in Oltenia - 1800–2000, which has gone through several editions.

== Awards ==
- Order of Merit in Culture;
- Laureate of the Romanian Academy for the monograph "Constantin Lecca" (2007);
- Laureate of the Pro-Victoria Arte Prize of the Marcel Guguianu Foundation (1998);
- Honorary citizen of Craiova (2012).

== Selected bibliography ==
- Artele plastice în Oltenia (1821–1944) (Scrisul Românesc, 1980)
- Ghidul Muzeului de Artă Craiova (in five editions, Meridiane, Arc 2000)
- Constantin Lecca (monograph, Meridiane, 1988, Arcade, 2005)
- Eustațiu Stoenescu (monograph, Meridiane, 1985, Arc 2000, 1998)
- Pictorul Stoica Dumitrescu (monograph, Meridiane, 1990)
- Craiova. Studii și cercetări de istorie și istoria artei (Helios, 1999)
- Brâncuși la Craiova (Arc 2000, 2001)
- Artiști plastici craioveni (Arc 2000, 2003)
- Craiova. Amintirile orașului (Alma, 2007)
- Sculptori puțin cunoscuți (Alma, 2007)
- Caricaturistul N.S. Petrescu — Găină (monograph, Alma, 2008)
- Pictori puțin cunoscuți (Alma, 2009)
- Istoria artelor plastice în Oltenia (Alma, vol. I, 2010; vol. II, 2013)
- Brâncuși. Tatăl nostru (monograph, Autograf, 2012)
- Brâncuși. Ultimul dac (Autograf, 2014)
- Brâncuși. The Man and His Artwork. Catalogue raisonné of the sculptures. (Monitorul Oficial R.A., 2019)
