= Sălcuța, Dolj =

Sălcuța
- Commune
- Location in Romania
- Coordinates: 44°15′N 23°26′E
- Country: Romania
- County: Dolj

Government
  - Mayor (2020–2024): Aurica Giurcă (PSD)
- Area: 72.62 km^{2} (28.04 sq mi)
- Elevation: 164 m (538 ft)
- Population (2021-12-01): 2,032
  - Density: 28/km^{2} (72/sq mi)
- Time zone: EET/EEST (UTC+2/+3)
- Postal code: 207510
- Area code: +(40) 251
- Vehicle reg.: DJ
- Website: primaria-salcuta.ro

Sălcuța is a commune in Dolj County, Oltenia, Romania with a population of 2,032 people as of 2021. It is composed of four villages: Mârza, Plopșor, Sălcuța, and Tencănău.

== Natives ==
- Constantin S. Nicolăescu-Plopșor (1900–1968), historian, archaeologist, anthropologist, and ethnographer
