= SASA =

SASA may refer to:

== Organisations ==
- Saginaw Arts and Sciences Academy, a school in Saginaw, Michigan
- Scottish Agricultural Science Agency, formerly an executive agency of the Scottish Executive Environment and Rural Affairs Department
- Scottish Swimming, also known as the Scottish Amateur Swimming Association, a sports governing body
- Scouts South Africa, formerly known as the Scout Association of South Africa
- Serbian Academy of Sciences and Arts, an academic institution in Serbia
- Slovenian Academy of Sciences and Arts, the national academy of Slovenia
- South African Speleological Association, a caving organization in South Africa
- South Australian Society of Arts, former name of the Royal South Australian Society of Arts in Adelaide, Australia

== Other uses ==
- SASA, the ICAO code for Martín Miguel de Güemes International Airport, Argentina
- SASA Impact FC, a Canadian women's soccer team
- Solvent Accessible Surface Area, a measure of the solvent accessible surface area of a biomolecule
- South Australian Screen Awards, annual film awards held at the Mercury cinema in Adelaide, Australia
- Student Achievement and School Accountability Programs, a program in the U.S. Department of Education
