= Șasa =

Șasa may refer to several places in Romania:

- Șasa, a village in Lupșa Commune, Alba County
- Șasa, a village in Dănesti Commune, Gorj County
- Șasa, a village in Ileanda Commune, Sălaj County
- Șasa (river), a tributary of the Olteț in Vâlcea County
