= Sașa =

Sașa may refer to the following rivers in Romania:

- Sașa, a tributary of the Lotru in Vâlcea County
- Șasa (river), a tributary of the Olteț in Vâlcea County
- Sașa, a tributary of the Tismana in Gorj County
- Sașa, a tributary of the Zlast in Gorj County
