= Șasa (river) =

Șasa Sașa
- Location within Romania

Location
- Country: Romania
- Counties: Vâlcea County

Physical characteristics
- Mouth: Olteț
  - location: Gănești
  - coordinates: 44.7248°N 23.9088°E
- Length: 32 km (20 mi)
- Basin size: 103 km^{2} (40 sq mi)

Basin features
- Progression: Olteț→ Olt→ Danube→ Black Sea
- Tributaries
  - right: Zgubea

The Șasa (also: Sașa) is a left tributary of the river Olteț in Romania. It discharges into the Olteț in Gănești. It flows through the communes Roșiile and Tetoiu. Its length is 32 km (20 mi) and its basin size is 103 km^{2} (40 sq mi).
