= Carpen =

- Commune
- Location in Romania
- Coordinates: 44°21′N 23°16′E
- Country: Romania
- County: Dolj
- Population (2021-12-01): 2,063
- Time zone: EET/EEST (UTC+2/+3)
- Vehicle reg.: DJ

Carpen is a commune in Dolj County, Oltenia, Romania with a population of 2,063 people as of 2021. It is composed of three villages: Carpen, Cleanov, and Geblești.

== Natives ==
- Stelian Neagoe (1938 – 2021), historian
