= Sása =

Sása may refer to:

- Sása, Revúca District, Slovakia
- Sása, Zvolen District, Slovakia

== See also ==
- Szász
