= Tetoiu =

- Commune
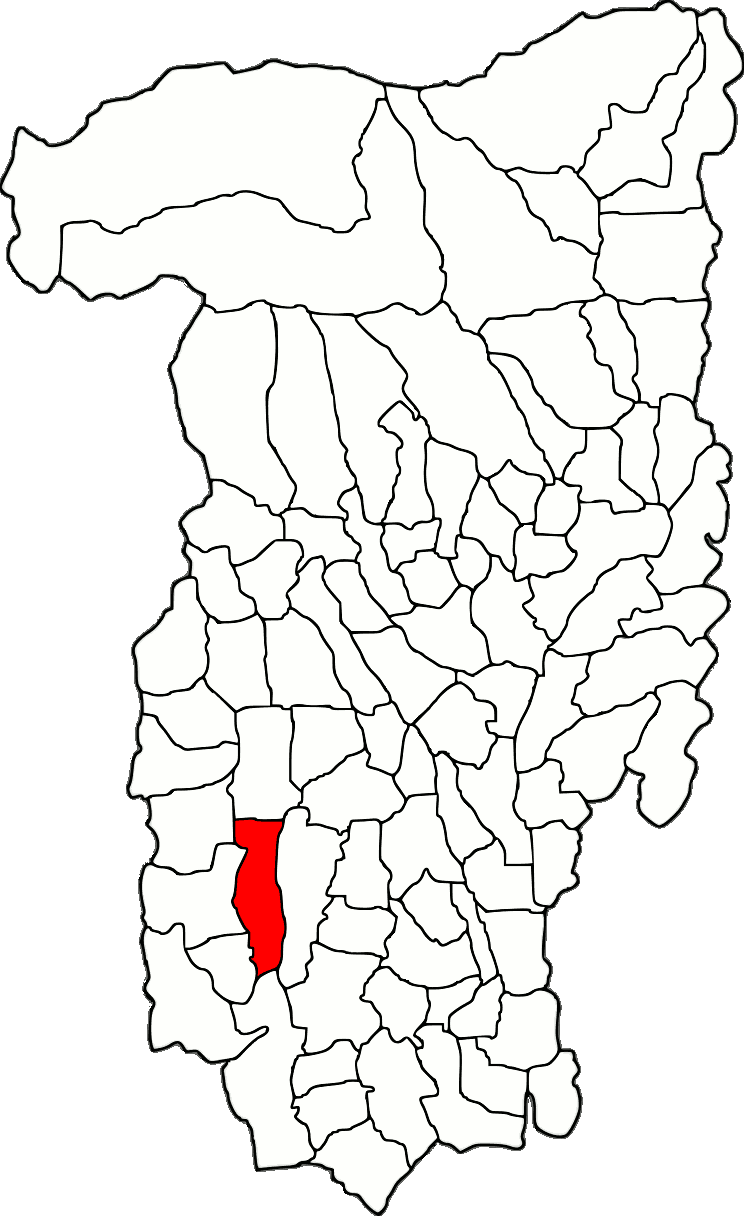
- Location in Vâlcea County

- Location in Romania
- Coordinates: 44°45′N 23°55′E
- Country: Romania
- County: Vâlcea
- Population (2021-12-01): 2,206
- Time zone: UTC+02:00 (EET)
  - Summer (DST): UTC+03:00 (EEST)
- Vehicle reg.: VL

Tetoiu is a commune located in Vâlcea County, Oltenia, Romania. It is composed of seven villages: Băroiu, Budele, Măneasa, Nenciulești, Popești, Tetoiu (until 1968 Bugiulești) and Țepești.

In the Bugiulești area in 1962, the paleoanthropologist Constantin S. Nicolăescu-Plopșor uncovered several humanoid fossilised bone fragments, including a skull, believed to belong to a variety of Homo habilis (dubbed Homo olteniensis or Australoanthropus olteniensis) dating back roughly two million years, which would make them the oldest hominid fossils in Europe, although the discovery and authenticity has been questioned. Some of the artefacts are currently exhibited in the Museum of Oltenia in Craiova, although the more "controversial" findings are located in the Vasile Pârvan Institute of Archaeology.
