= Museum of Oltenia =

Museum in Craiova, Romania

Coordinates: 44.31857°N 23.79354°E

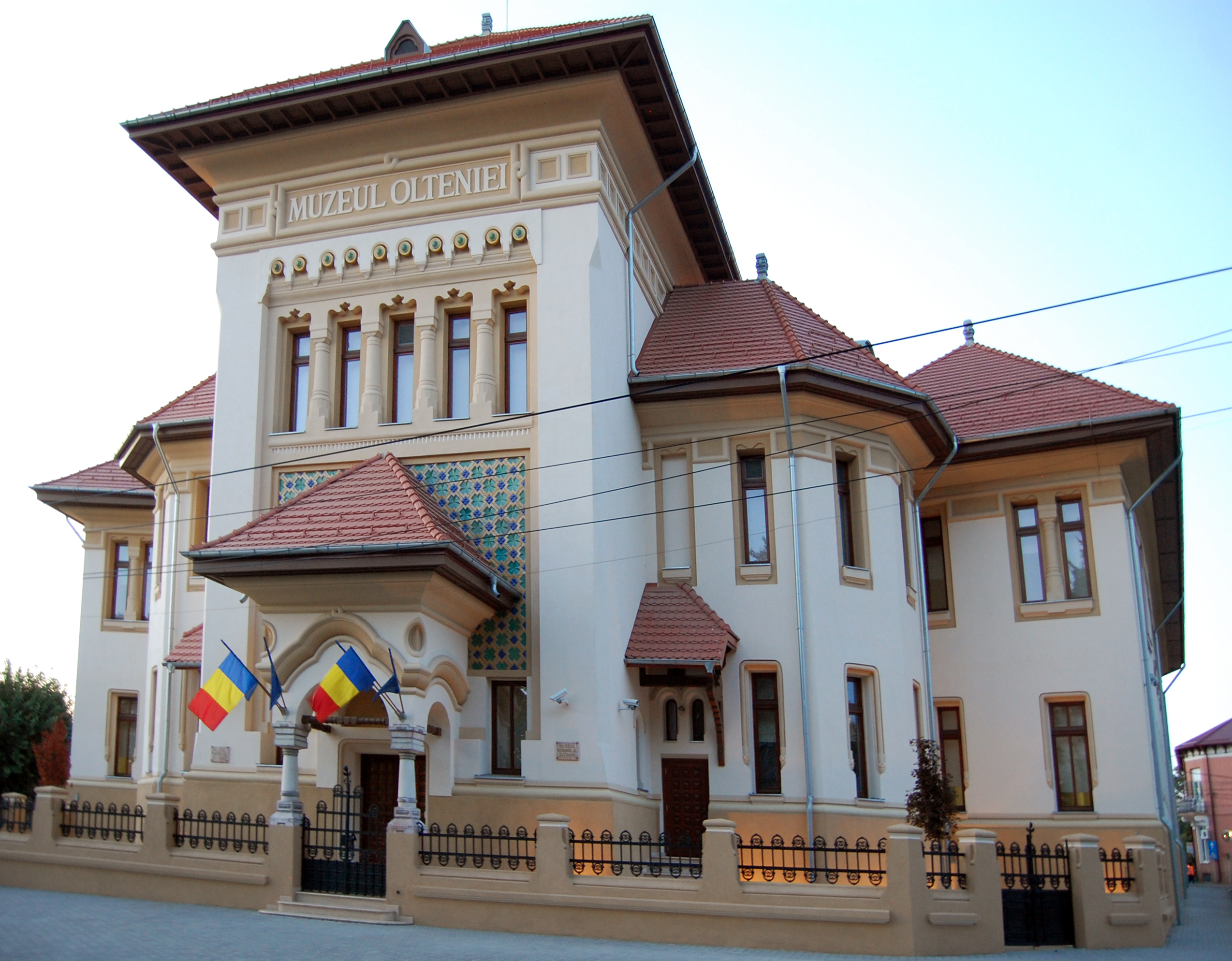
View of the Museum of Oltenia

The Museum of Oltenia (Romanian: Muzeul Olteniei) is a multidisciplinary museum in the city of Craiova, Oltenia, Romania.

The archaeology section of museum was founded on 1 April 1915. The natural history section was founded in 1923 and the museum as it is structured today was established in 1928.

The museum is divided into three sections housed in separate buildings: ethnography, history/archaeology, and natural history. The collection is based on donations made in 1908.

The building on Matei Basarab Street dates from the 15th century and is one of the oldest in the city. It houses the ethnography exhibits. The building on Popa Street is the location of the natural history section and also a traditional pottery shop. The building on Madona Dudu Street houses the archaeology and history exhibits, including a new wing. The museum is an important tourist attraction in Craiova.

The museum is housed in a former girls' school; the building dates to 1905, and is listed as a historic monument by Romania's Ministry of Culture and Religious Affairs.

== See also ==
- Craiova Art Museum
