= Craiova Art Museum =

Art museum in Craiova, Romania

Coordinates: 44.3191°N 23.7950°E

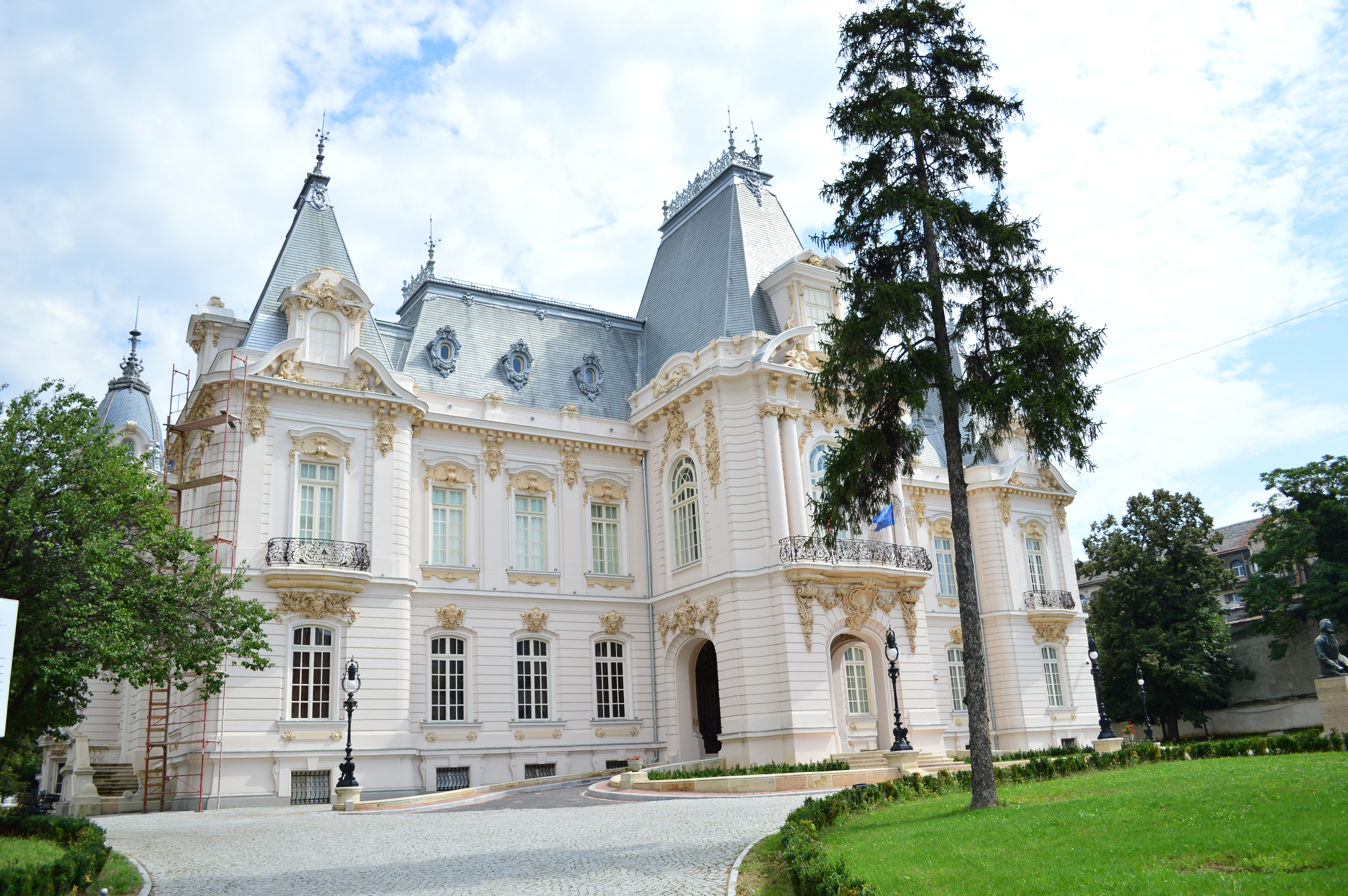
Constantin Mihail Palace, which now houses the Craiova Art Museum

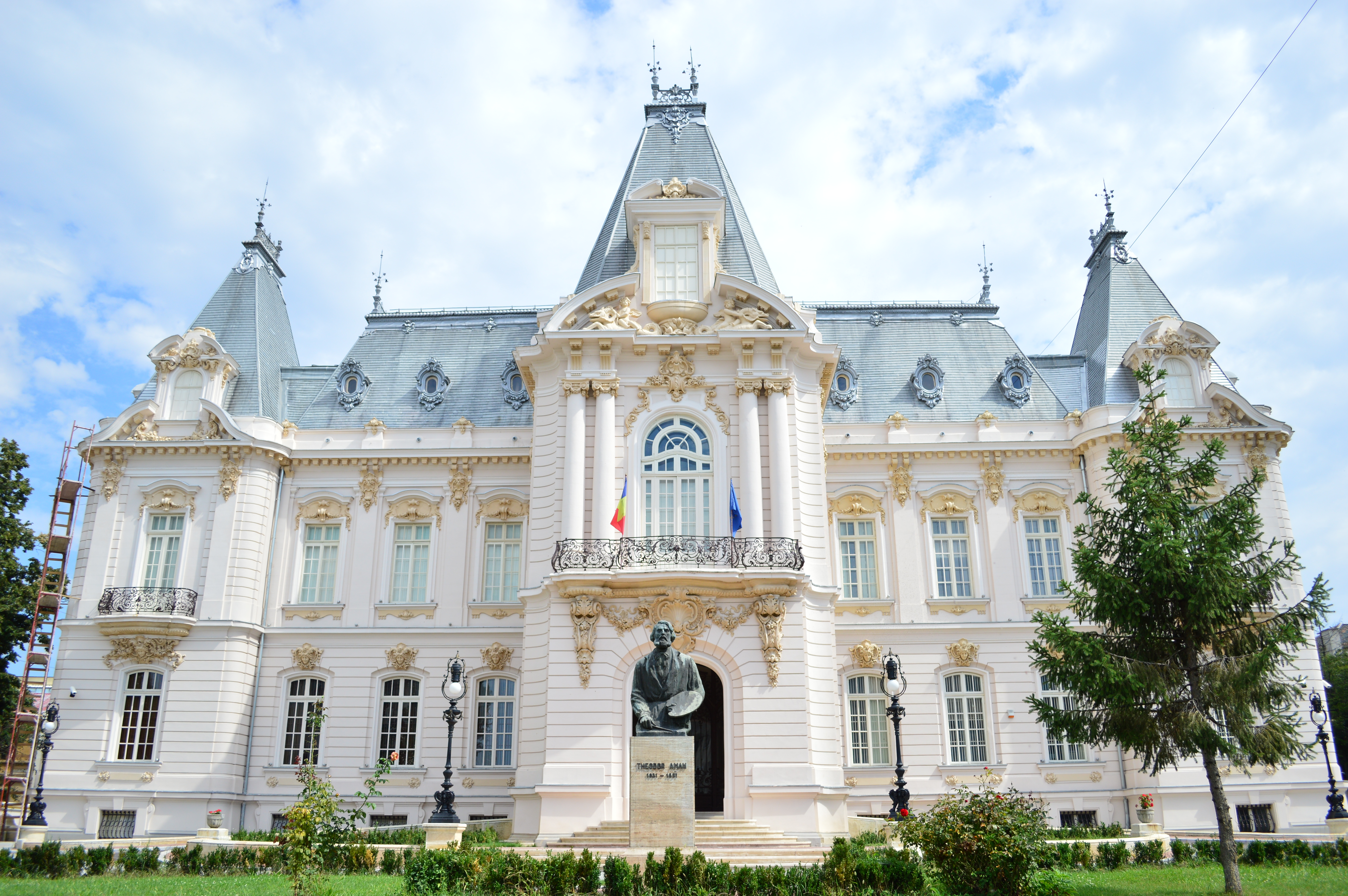
Front view of the building

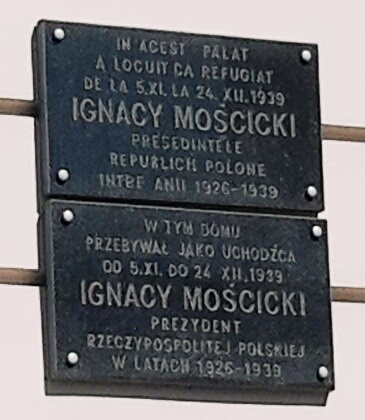
Plaque commemorating Mościcki's stay as a refugee in the Mihail Constantine Palace

The Craiova Art Museum (Romanian: Muzeul de Artă din Craiova) is an art museum in the city of Craiova, Oltenia, Romania.

The museum is housed in the Constantin Mihail Palace, built from 1898 to 1907 according to the plans of French architect Paul Gottereau. The palace once belonged to Michael Constantine (1837—1908), a member of one of the richest families in Romania and is known as the Jean Mihail Palace. The palace is decorated with Carrara marble stairs, Lyon silk walls, Murano glass chandeliers, painted ceilings, partly gilded stucco, and Venetian mirrors. It has hosted kings of Romania, in 1939 the exiled Polish president Ignacy Mościcki (1867–1946), and the former Yugoslav leader Josip Broz Tito (1892–1980).

The museum was founded in 1954. It is the main art museum in Craiova and is a significant tourist attraction for the city. A major attraction of the museum is the gallery dedicated to Constantin Brâncuși, exhibiting six of his early sculptures (including variants of his best-known works): Vitellius (1898), Miss Pogany (1902), The Vainglory (1905), Boy's Head (1906), The Kiss (1907), and Woman Torso (1909). It also has a variety of paintings by important Romanian masters such as Theodor Aman, Nicolae Grigorescu, Vasile Popescu, Ștefan Luchian, and Theodor Pallady, together with some Romanian icons.

The palace is listed as a historic monument by Romania's Ministry of Culture.

== See also ==
- Museum of Oltenia, Craiova
