= Coșoveni =

- Commune
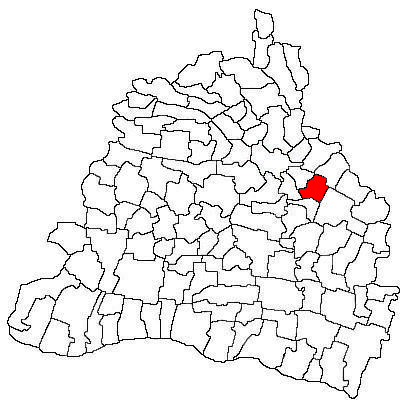
- Location in Dolj County

- Location in Romania
- Coordinates: 44°15′N 23°56′E
- Country: Romania
- County: Dolj
- Area: 75.09 km^{2} (28.99 sq mi)
- Population (2021-12-01): 3,238
  - Density: 43.12/km^{2} (111.7/sq mi)
- Time zone: UTC+02:00 (EET)
  - Summer (DST): UTC+03:00 (EEST)
- Vehicle reg.: DJ
- Website: cosoveni.ro

Coșoveni is a commune in Dolj County, Oltenia, Romania with a population of 4,982 people. It is composed of a single village, Coșoveni. It also included the village of Cârcea until 2004, when it was split off to form a separate commune.

== Gallery ==
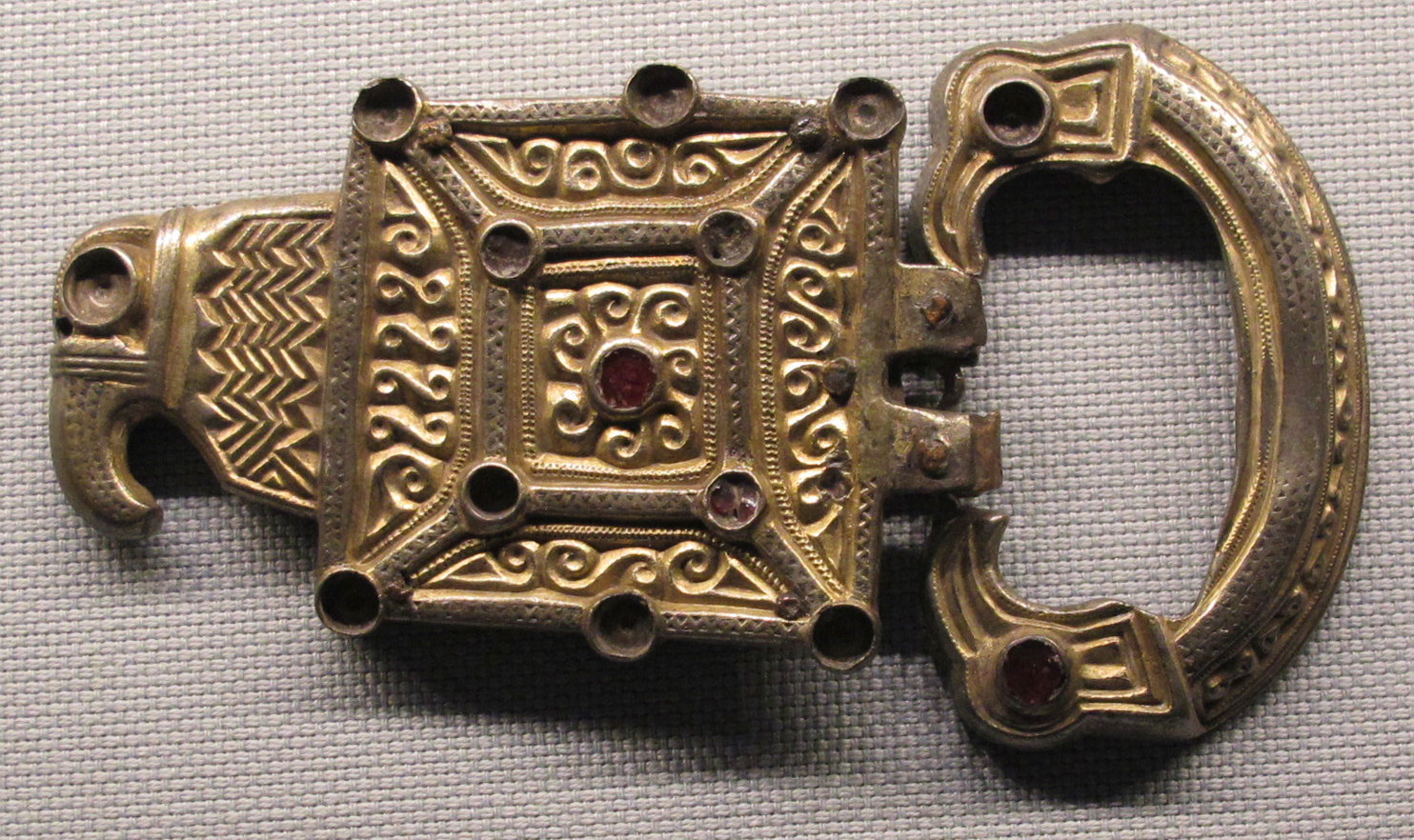
First hoard of Coșoveni, 5th century AD, possibly of Taifal origin, buckle

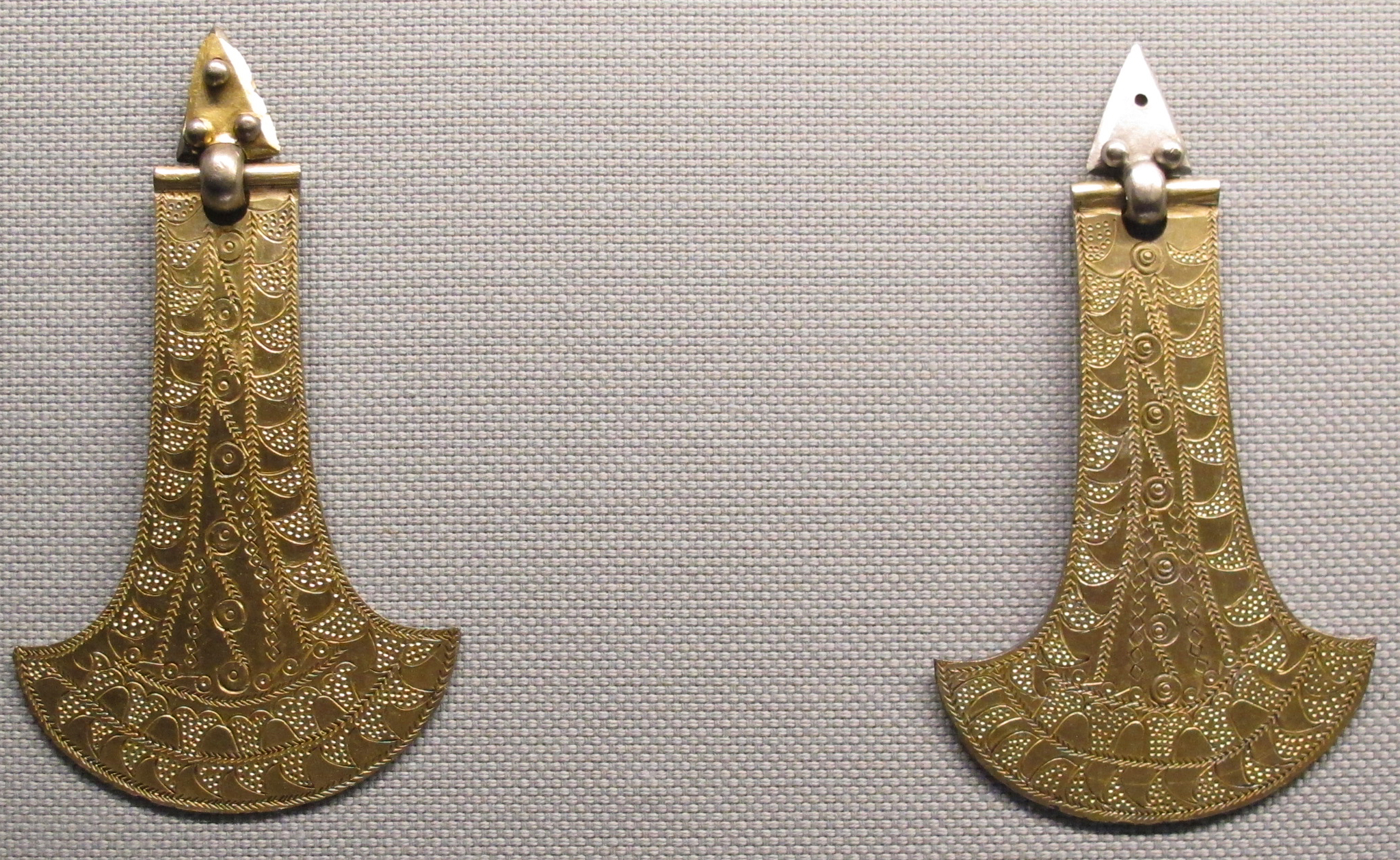
First hoard of Coșoveni, pieces of harness

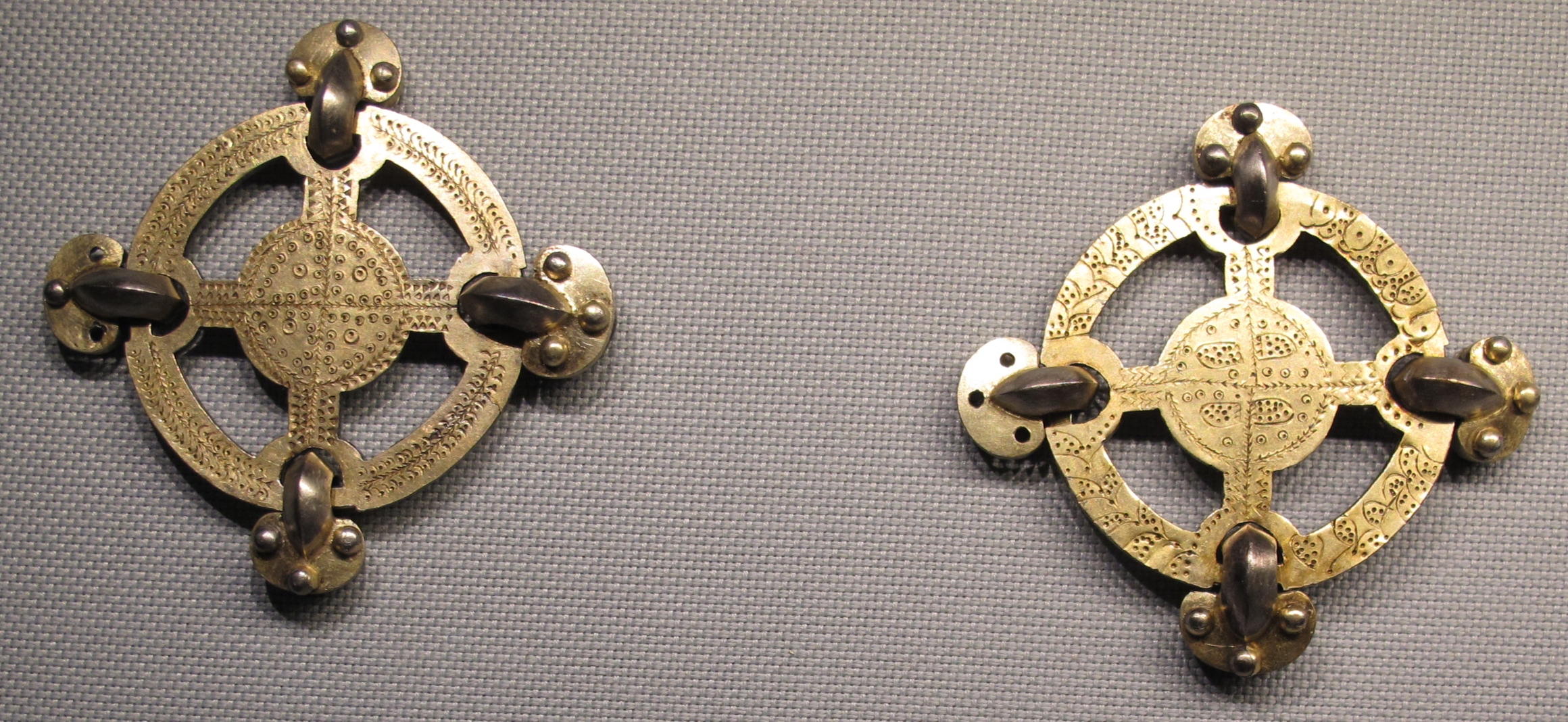
First hoard of Coșoveni, pieces of harness

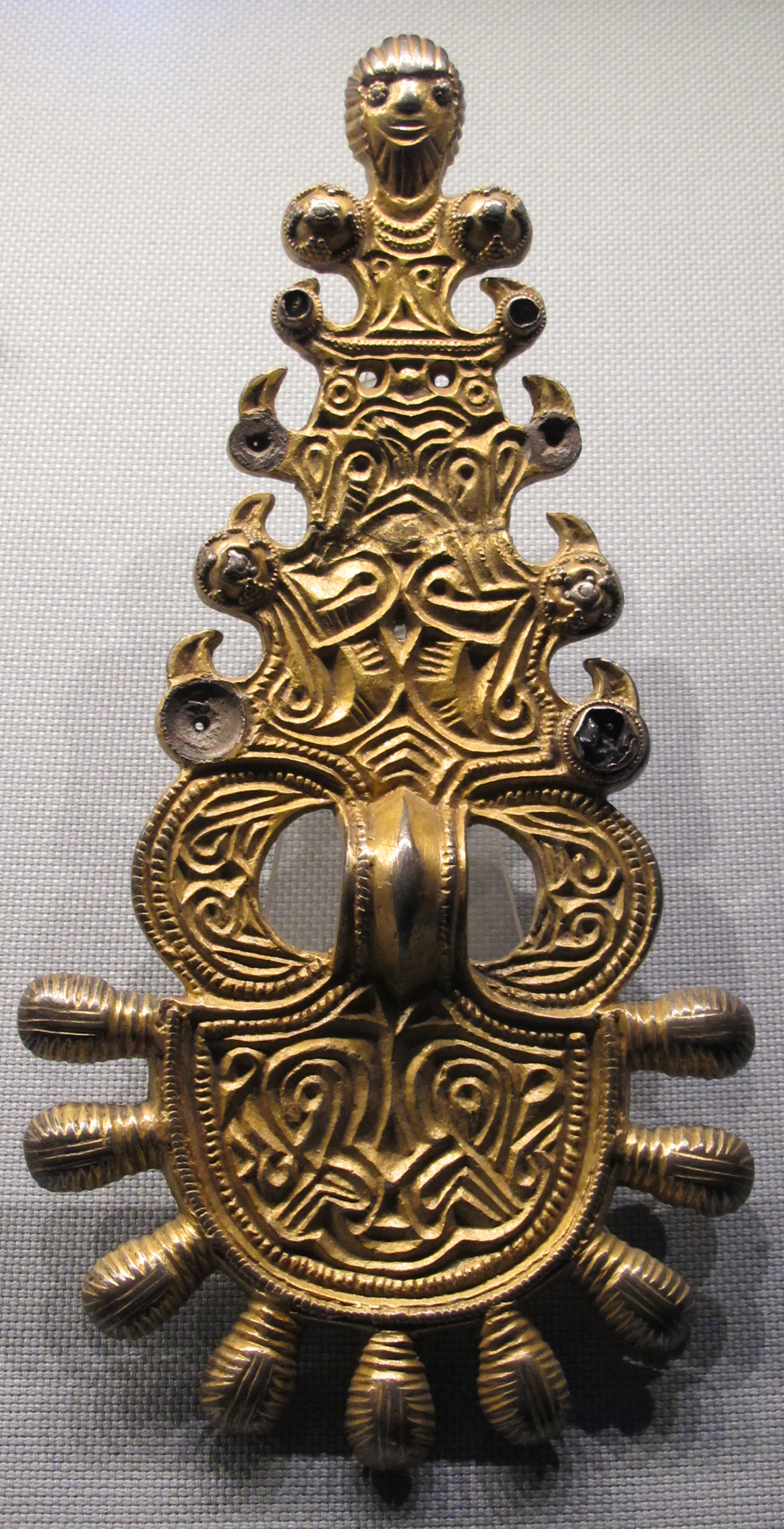
Second hoard of Coșoveni, 7th century AD, possibly of Byzantine origin, pieces of harness

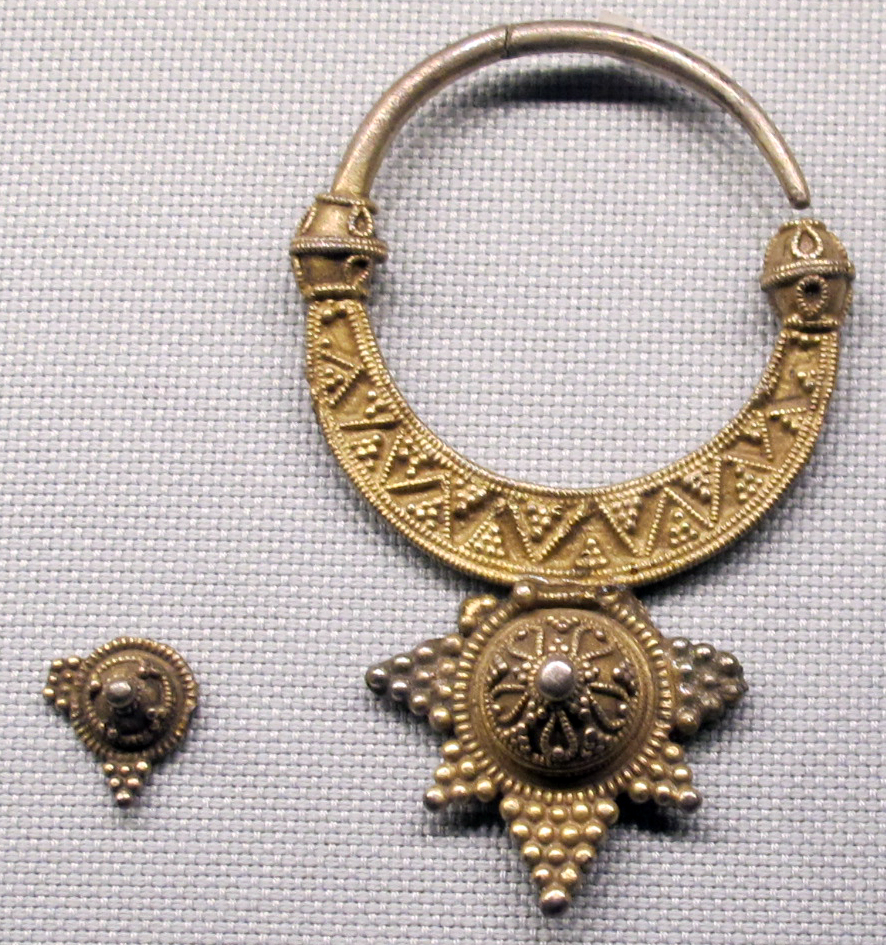
Second hoard of Coșoveni, pieces of harness
