= Cârcea =

- Commune
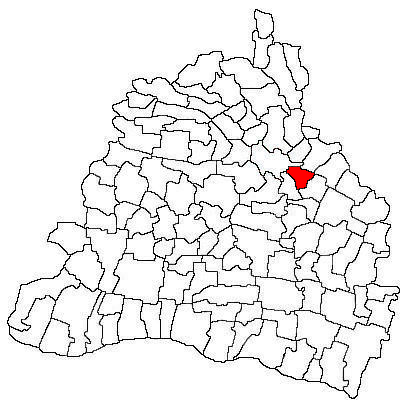
- Location in Dolj County

- Location in Romania
- Coordinates: 44°16′N 23°54′E
- Country: Romania
- County: Dolj

Government
  - Mayor (2020–2024): Valerică Pupăză (PSD)
- Area: 32.7 km^{2} (12.6 sq mi)
- Elevation: 182 m (597 ft)
- Population (2021-12-01): 4,644
  - Density: 142/km^{2} (368/sq mi)
- Time zone: EET/EEST (UTC+2/+3)
- Postal code: 207206
- Area code: +(40) 251
- Vehicle reg.: DJ
- Website: www.primariacarcea.ro

Cârcea is a commune in Dolj County, Oltenia, Romania with a population of 4,644 people as of 2021. It is composed of a single village, Cârcea, part of Coșoveni Commune until 2004, when it was split off.

Historical population
Year	Pop.	±%
2002	1,808	—
2011	3,424	+89.4%
2021	4,644	+35.6%
Source: Census data
