= Amărăștii =

Amărăștii may refer to one of two communes in Dolj County, Romania:

- Amărăștii de Jos
- Amărăștii de Sus
