= Amărăștii de Jos =

- Commune
- The center of Amărăștii de Jos

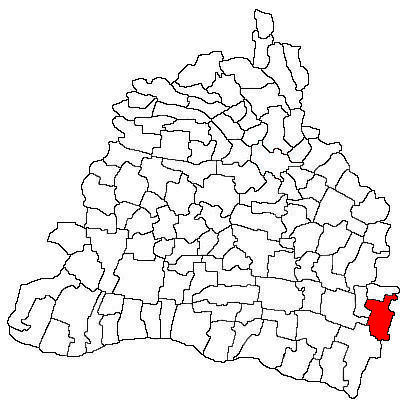
- Location in Dolj County

- Location in Romania
- Coordinates: 43.954°N 24.166°E
- Country: Romania
- County: Dolj

Government
  - Mayor (2020–2024): Constantin Dinu (PSD)
- Area: 55.12 km^{2} (21.28 sq mi)
- Elevation: 118 m (387 ft)
- Population (2021-12-01): 5,132
  - Density: 93.11/km^{2} (241.1/sq mi)
- Time zone: UTC+02:00 (EET)
  - Summer (DST): UTC+03:00 (EEST)
- Postal code: 207020
- Area code: +(40) 251
- Vehicle reg.: DJ
- Website: www.comunaamarastiidejos.ro

Amărăștii de Jos is a commune in Dolj County, Oltenia, Romania. It is composed of three villages: Amărăștii de Jos, Ocolna, and Praporu.

== Natives ==
- Ioan D. Mihăescu (1891–1957), general in World War II
