= Radu =

Radu may refer to:

== People ==
- Radu (given name), Romanian masculine given name
- Radu (surname), Romanian surname
- Rulers of Wallachia, see Radu (given name) § Romanian rulers
- Prince Radu of Romania (born 1960), disputed pretender to the former Romanian throne

== Other uses ==
- Radu (weapon), a Romanian radiological weapon
- Radu, Iran (disambiguation), multiple places
- A tributary of the Mraconia in Mehedinți County, Romania
- A tributary of the Tarcău in Neamț County, Romania
- Radu Vladislas, a fictional vampire and the primary antagonist of the Subspecies film series

== See also ==
- Radu Negru (disambiguation)
- Radu Vodă (disambiguation)
- Ruda (disambiguation)
