= Rădești =

Rădeşti may refer to several places in Romania:

- Rădeşti, a commune in Alba County
- Rădeşti, a commune in Galați County
- Rădeşti, a village in Almaș Commune, Arad County
- Rădeşti, a village in Stâlpeni Commune, Argeș County
- Rădeşti, a village in Oporelu Commune, Olt County
- Rădeşti, a village in Costeşti Commune, Vaslui County

== See also ==
- Radu (given name)
- Radu (surname)
- Rădulescu (surname)
- Răducan (surname)
- Răducanu (surname)
- Rădeni (disambiguation)
- Răduțești (disambiguation)
- Rădulești (disambiguation)
