= Rădulești (disambiguation) =

Răduleşti is a commune in Ialomiţa County, Romania.

Răduleşti may also refer to several places in Romania:

- Răduleşti, a village in Dobra Commune, Hunedoara County
- Răduleşti, a village in Căuaș Commune, Satu Mare County
- Răduleşti, a village in Crevenicu Commune, Teleorman County
- Răduleşti, a village in Vânatori Commune, Vrancea County

== See also ==
- Radu (given name)
- Radu (surname)
- Rădulescu (surname)
- Răducan (surname)
- Răducanu (surname)
- Rădeni (disambiguation)
- Rădești (disambiguation)
- Răduțești (disambiguation)
