= Rădeni =

Rădeni may refer to:

In Moldova:

- Rădeni, Călărași, a commune in Călărași district
- Rădeni, Strășeni, a commune in Strășeni district

In Romania:

- Rădeni, a village in Frumușica Commune, Botoșani County
- Rădeni, a village in Roșcani Commune, Iași County
- Rădeni, a village in Păstrăveni Commune, Neamț County
- Rădeni, a village in Dragomirești Commune, Vaslui County

== See also ==
- Radu (given name)
- Radu (surname)
- Rădulescu (surname)
- Răducan (surname)
- Răducanu (surname)
- Rădești (disambiguation)
- Răduțești (disambiguation)
- Rădulești (disambiguation)
