= Răduțești =

Răduțești may refer to several villages in Romania:

- Răduțești, a village in Ciomăgești Commune, Argeș County
- Răduțești, a village in Butoiești Commune, Mehedinți County

== See also ==
- Radu (given name)
- Radu (surname)
- Rădulescu (surname)
- Răducan (surname)
- Răducanu (surname)
- Rădeni (disambiguation)
- Rădești (disambiguation)
- Rădulești (disambiguation)
