= Ayssuragan =

Ayssuragan is a symphonic poem for clarinet in B-flat and orchestra written by the Spanish composer and pianist Gustavo Díaz-Jerez. Ayssuragan, meaning “the place of freezing” in the extinct language of the Guanches, aborigines of the Canary Islands, refers to the place where, in the final moments of the European conquest of the island of La Palma, the non-combatant population took refuge and died. Together with Ymarxa, Aranfaybo, Chigaday, Azaenegue, Erbane and Guanapay, Ayssuragan is part of a cycle of seven orchestral works inspired in different places of each of the Canary Islands. Ayssuragan is a one-movement work lasting about 25 minutes, merging elements from spectralism and algorithmic procedures. It was premiered on 14 December 2012 by the Symphonic Orchestra of Tenerife under the baton of Antoine Marguier with Cristo Barrios as a soloist at the Auditorium Adán Martín of Tenerife.
