= Pablo Díaz =

Pablo Díaz may refer to:

- Pablo Díaz (footballer, born 1971), Spanish footballer
- Pablo Díaz (footballer, born 1981), Spanish footballer
- Pablo Díaz (game show contestant) (born 1997), Spanish violinist and Pasapalabra contestant
- Pedro Díaz (baseball) (born 1910), Cuban baseball player

== See also ==
- El Guincho, (born 1983), Spanish musician born Pablo Díaz-Reixa
- Paulo Díaz (born 1994), Chilean footballer
