= Chigaday =

Orchestral composition by Gustavo Díaz-Jerez

Chigaday is an orchestral piece of classical music by the Spanish composer and pianist Gustavo Díaz-Jerez. Chigaday refers to a rocky formation in the Canary Island of La Gomera where, according to writer and historian Benito Pérez Armas, in 1488 during the Spanish conquest of the Canary Islands, the last islanders who resisted decided to kill themselves before surrendering to the enemy troops. Together with Ymarxa, Ayssuragan, Aranfaybo, Azaenegue, Erbane and Guanapay, Chigaday is part of Maghek, a cycle of seven orchestral works inspired in different places of each of the Canary Islands. Chigaday was commissioned by the Fundación Autor and the AEOS (Spanish Association of Symphonic Orchestras) and given its first performance on June 3, 2016, at the Auditorio de Tenerife by the Orquesta Sinfónica de Tenerife under maestro Perry So. It was very well received by audience and critics alike. Chigaday is a one-movement work lasting about 20 minutes, merging elements from spectralism and algorithmic procedures.
