= Răducan =

Răducan is a Romanian surname.

People with this surname include:

- Johnny Răducanu, né Răducan Crețu (1931 in Brăila, Muntenia – 2011), a Romanian jazz pianist of Romani descent
- Necula Răducan(u) (born 1946 in Vlădeni, Ialomița, Muntenia)
- Marcel Răducan (born 1967 in Grinăuţi-Moldova, Moldova), a Moldovan politician
- Narcis Claudiu Răducan (born 1974 in Focşani, Vrancea, Moldavia), a Romanian football player
- Andreea Mădălina Răducan (born 1983 in Bârlad, Moldavia), a Romanian female gymnast

== See also ==
- Răducanu (surname)
- Radu (given name)
- Radu (surname)
- Rădulescu (surname)
- Rădeni (disambiguation)
- Rădești (disambiguation)
- Răduțești (disambiguation)
- Rădulești (disambiguation)
