= Nick Davies (conductor) =

Welsh-born conductor

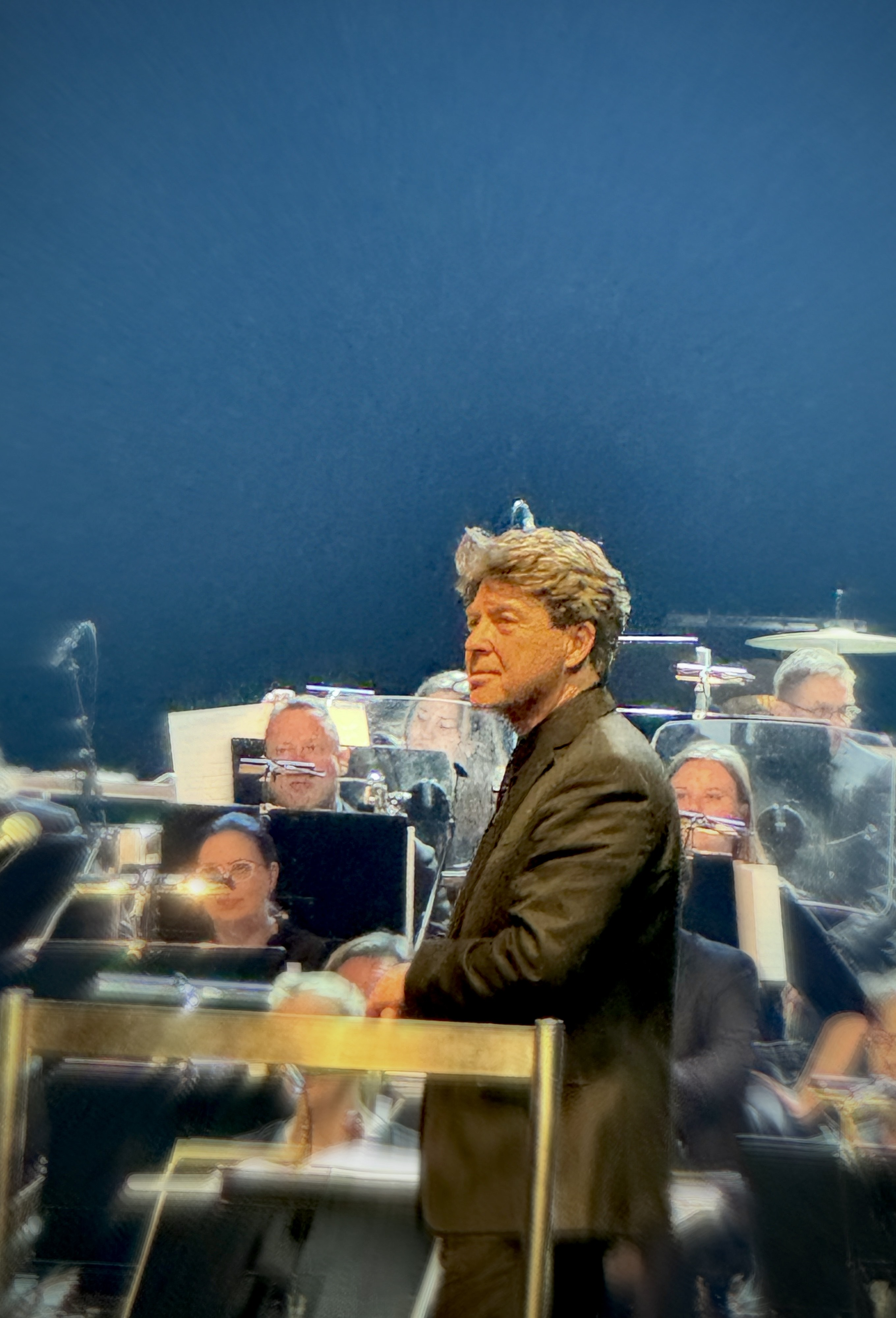
Nick Davies with the Vantaa Pops Orchestra during The Music of Star Wars concert at the Tampere Hall (December 2025).

Nick Davies is a Welsh-born conductor who has served as the chief conductor of the Finnish Vantaa Pops Orchestra (Vantaan viihdeorkesteri) since 2011. As a guest conductor, Davies has appeared with numerous European orchestras. He has worked particularly frequently with the Royal Philharmonic Orchestra and the Norwegian Radio Orchestra. In 2009, Davies made his Australian debut with the Melbourne Symphony Orchestra. In 2018, he conducted at the Classic BRIT Awards. Davies has worked with musicians such as Lang Lang, Herbie Hancock, Earth Wind & Fire and Sting.

Nick Davies studied piano and violin at the Royal College of Music in London. Davies began his career as a conductor in 1986, initially working in musical theatre. His West End credits include Martin Guerre, Oklahoma!, The Sound of Music, Annie Get Your Gun, Fred Astaire: His Daughter’s Tribute, The Phantom of the Opera, and My Fair Lady. Davies served as musical director for New York City Opera's production of Rodgers and Hammerstein’s Cinderella, which toured Japan, and conducted the world premiere of Garbo: The Musical at the Oscar Theatre in Stockholm.

== As guest conductor ==
Including:

- City of Birmingham Symphony Orchestra
- Royal Liverpool Philharmonic
- The Hallé
- BBC Concert Orchestra
- Royal Philharmonic Orchestra
- Royal Scottish National Orchestra
- Royal Northern Sinfonia
- City of London Sinfonia
- Helsinki Philharmonic Orchestra
- Stavanger Symphony Orchestra
- Trondheim Symphony Orchestra
- Bergen Philharmonic Orchestra
- Lahti Symphony Orchestra
- Orquesta Sinfónica de Tenerife
- Orquesta Sinfónica de Galicia
- Royal Stockholm Philharmonic Orchestra
- Kristiansand Symphony Orchestra
- Orchestra della Toscana
- Gothenburg Symphony Orchestra
- Turku Philharmonic Orchestra
- Tampere Philharmonic Orchestra
- Oulu Symphony Orchestra
- Kuopio Symphony Orchestra
