= G. M. Vlădescu =

Romanian writer (1885–1952)

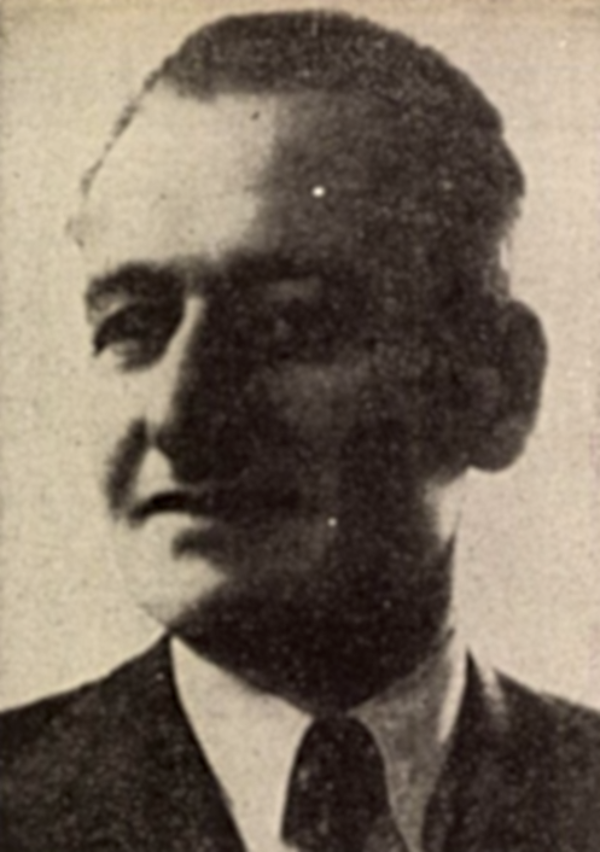
- Vlădescu c. 1930
- Born: 2 March 1885; Cotești, Râmnicu Sărat County, Kingdom of Romania
- Died: 29 March 1952 (aged 67); Dumitrești, Buzău Region, Romanian People's Republic
- Occupations: Journalist; editor; translator; propagandist; civil servant; archivist; farmer
- Writing career
- Period: 1912–1946
- Genres: Short story; sketch story; novella; social novel; psychological novel; war novel; satire; essay; biography; drama; tragicomedy; farce
- Movements: Didacticism; Gândirea

George Mihail Vlădescu, first name also Gheorghe (2 March 1885 – 29 March 1952), was a Romanian prose writer, dramatist, and translator. From an impoverished middle-class background, claiming to have always been at risk of social exclusion (and adapting himself to a life of relative isolation), he accumulated a vast experience of life on the periphery. His resulting literary work was ideologically colored by didacticism, Christian humanism, and sometimes by ambiguously leftist messaging. It was well-liked by the public, particularly after 1930, but received mixed receptions from literary professionals, who objected to his preachiness and penchant for the melodrama—in some readings, most of his novels are relegated to paraliterature. Vlădescu was active for a while within the Gândirea group in interwar Greater Romania, agreeing with its more conservative form of literary modernism. In such context, he issued scathing attacks against modernists such as Eugen Lovinescu and George Călinescu, also dismissing young writers as too sensationalistic, or borderline pornographic.

Vlădescu, who could never cover his expenses from the literary craft, was professionally active as a clerk, and later in life withdrew into the countryside, once owning a chicken farm at Fundulea. He also took jobs as a government propagandist, and at the start of World War II was putting out a magazine for the Romanian Land Forces. He remained friendly and protective of Jewish colleagues during the age of antisemitic fascism, once allowing the repressed Marius Mircu to publish as "G. M. Vlădescu". He made attempted returns to public life upon the anti-fascist coup of 1944, but the communist regime refused to acknowledge him as an ally. Suffering with heart trouble, he died in self-imposed seclusion at Dumitrești, where he is also buried. His posthumous legacy remains conflicted, between those who seen his re-inclusion into the canon of Romanian literature, and those who regard him as passable at best.

== Biography ==
=== Early life ===
Vlădescu was born in Cotești, Râmnicu Sărat County, on the traditional border between Moldavia and Wallachia. His parents were Mihai Vlădescu, a clerk, and his wife, Elena, née Fleva, who also had seven other children. Elena's brother was the politician Nicolae Fleva; the writer, who was widely regarded as the prototype of an ethnic Romanian, reportedly confessed to his Jewish friend, Emil Dorian, that the Flevas were of "Gypsy" descent. With his family roots planted in Muntenia, he also complained that the Western Moldavians among whom he settled always regarded him as an outsider, or even that they froze him out. Young Vlădescu had a high-school education in Focșani and Bacău—he settled in the latter town, and worked for many years as a clerk. His literary debut came in 1912, when his first writing appeared in Sentinela of Focșani; a year later, he was editing Căminul magazine in Bacău, but it closed down after only two issues—not before hosting three of his more melodramatic stories, signed as "Mihail Corbea".

In 1915–1916, Vlădescu was literary editor and columnist at Curierul Bacăului, a weekly newspaper which also hosted his novella, Dureri fără nume ("Pains That Go Unnamed"). A selection of his sketch stories came out as a volume, Lacrimi adevărate ("True Tears"), in 1915, followed in 1922 by Tăcere... ("Silence..."). Literary historian Ioan Oprișan describes these as "inconclusive" works, heavily reliant on tropes borrowed from Ioan A. Bassarabescu, Ioan Alexandru Brătescu-Voinești, Ion Luca Caragiale, and Mihail Sadoveanu. Another scholar in that field, Teodor Vârgolici, believed that such pieces "lack all substance", concluding: "Even when encountering interesting facets of life, the author lacks sufficient resources to make them stand out." Vârgolici additionally observes tendencies toward sentimentalism and didacticism, especially with sketches such as Cântecul lebedei ("Swan-song"), where he invokes clichés about the "fallen woman", "seeking to demonstrate how an outraged humanity often hides beneath the condition of degradation." Overall: "The issues are approached in a humanitarian, sentimental spirit, marked by outpourings of pity."

A cartoonist and fellow interwar writer, Neagu Rădulescu, once observed that Vlădescu, "famished and always downcast", had lived through times of extreme poverty, but also that this never altered his "golden soul". In time, the novelist accumulated a great familiarity with regular life, especially on the margins of society. In a 1937 review, columnist Silviu Cernea proposed that he had "an infinite number of biographical experiences", having become the most seasoned author of those active in Romania at the time. This did not prevent Vlădescu's working in strict isolation from other members of his profession. As observed by scholar Liviu Papuc, who cites testimonials by Vlădescu's friends, the writer was a loner, "indifferent to things that happened around him", but "likeable and interesting" whenever he opened up in conversation.

=== Licăriri period ===
During the early 1920s, with his contributions in Licăriri bimonthly of Galați, he mocked certain strains in literary modernism, while defending others. As such, he suggested that culture-critic Eugen Lovinescu suffered from a "mental derangement", which had caused him to rate Liviu Rebreanu higher than Duiliu Zamfirescu; instead, he focused his attention on another novelist, Camil Petrescu, proclaiming that all hope of renewal came from him and his Gândirea circle. In 1922, Gândirea hosted Vlădescu's fragment, Micica, about the death of an eponymous cat. Its "domestic sweetness" was noticed by Lovinescu's Sburătorul, which added: "However, the author is incapable of writing artistically."

Vlădescu experienced more exposure in 1924–1925, when one of his plays, Surioara de la Focșani ("The Little Sister in Focșani") was performed in Iași by Sandu Teleajen's company, and in Bucharest by the People's Theater. Shortly after, he published another play, Măgarul verde ("The Green Donkey"), in Licăriri. Another known play, Huhurezul ("The Owl"), endured in manuscript form. As shown by his letters to archivist Aurel Barbier, by 1924 Vlădescu was touring Greater Romania, connecting with the various literary circles between Cluj and Suceava. Affiliated with the short-lived Comoedia weekly of Iași, he contributed short biographical essays on various literary figures, including Sadoveanu and Bassarabescu, but also A. de Herz, Constantin Dobrogeanu-Gherea, and Emil Gârleanu. According to memoirist G. Stati, in Western Moldavia he was known as a "man of the left", who got greatly upset when his acquaintances pranked him by pretending to arrange a meeting between him and a figure of the far-right. Vlădescu himself confessed that he was never daring enough for success, that he avoided politics altogether, and that the only fellow writers he fully trusted were Felix Aderca, Ion Minulescu, Corneliu Moldovanu, and I. Peltz. During rare, heated debates at the Romanian Writers' Society (SSR), he demanded recognition for Jews such as Ury Benador and Ion Călugăru, and also for the modernist Simion Stolnicu.

In 1930, Vlădescu was in Bucharest, where he tried to inaugurate another magazine of his own. Called Orientări ("Directions"), it obtained prestigious signatures—Mihail Cruceanu, Octavian Goga, George Lesnea, Simion Mehedinți—, but still went under, after putting out just one issue. Instead, Vlădescu himself was welcomed by various central and provincial reviews and newspapers. He was especially liked by the readers of Convorbiri Literare, especially for his piece Gâște ieftine ("Cheap Geese"). Other venues include Gândirea, Adevărul Literar și Artistic, Convorbiri Critice, Facla, Neamul Românesc, Rampa, Ramuri, Universul Literar, Năzuința, and Cosânzeana. He sometimes used the pen names g.m.vl., G.M.VL., O.B., Odo Basca, Mihail-Vlădescu, and G. M. Vlădescu-Vlad.

=== The lionized author ===
As a novelist, Vlădescu broke through with Menuetul ("The Menuet"). He wrote it while living on handouts from the Bucharest city government, and essentially self-published it. Upon publication, it was widely held as exceptional, winning him the SSR prize in 1933. According to reviewers such as Oprișan and Vârgolici, it is his singular masterpiece; its unseen character, the internationally successful violinist Paul Manolache, is invoked as a pretext for studies into provincial psychologies. Vârgolici commended the "secretive irony" of its satire, but also its tragic undertones, especially as relating to the elevation and degradation of Paul's innocent mother, "a victim of the venomous atmosphere that surrounds her." Menuetul was regarded by other readers as a laudable effort, but not quite a landmark. Poet Camil Baltazar suggested that it had "the romanticism of an alluring narrative, albeit one of minor depth", while essayist Alexandru George noted it as a "rather naïve epic improvisation", whose lyricism worked, overall.

Building on earlier praise by critic George Călinescu (who had acknowledged his "profound resonance with the fundamental questions of existence"), Papuc sees the matured Vlădescu as a worthy dissident in Romanian literature, which was at the time a terrain for naturalists and "chaotic" psychoanalysts. Vlădescu was explicitly against these two categories, explaining in 1935 that he did not understand why literary novices were seeking to cultivate "obscenity" and "filth". He himself disliked Călinescu, who had debuted as a novelist with Cartea nunții. In a 1933 issue of Ideea Literară magazine, which was managed by Radu Gyr, Vlădescu described that work as a detestable for its "platitudes, darkness, desolation, [and] snobbery".

Vlădescu followed up with Moartea fratelui meu ("My Brother's Death"), which took the Femina Prize of 1934. Here, two childhood friends, Lucu and Nucu, are separated by World War I, and meet each other just as Nucu has been sentenced to die for treason. As a final gesture of protest toward the absurdity of war, Lucu feeds Nucu on comforting lies, then shoots him dead in his sleep—thus sparing him the indignity of facing a firing squad. George described the text as bridging lyricism and psychology, with "the implications of a morbid eternity" as a background theme. He saw the mixture as subpar, arguing that the poetic touch had only worked in Menuetul. The modernist Bilete de Papagal was openly derisive: "[This is] a volume where naivety coexists perfectly with a total lack of even basic critical judgment. And let's not bring up the supposed literary value—it's simply a two-bit work." Vârgolici assessed Moartea fratelui meu as a form of elevated paraliterature, proposing that its ultimate model was Eugène Sue, with his Mysteries of Paris; however, he also defended the social novel contained in the narrative framework, as "not uninteresting".

Enthuasiastic supporters of the work included a traditionalist columnist, Al. Lascarov-Moldovanu, who saw Moartea fratelui meu as "startling", recommending its author as "one of our greatest writers." Objecting to the negative reactions Vlădescu had received from across the board, the Gândirea house critic, Ovidiu Papadima, demanded empathy—not because the book had aesthetic value, but because of its "Christian compassion". Building on Papadima's observations in a 2018 essay, critic Mircea Platon argued, like Vârgolici, that Moartea fratelui meu worked as a social novel. The documentary-like chapters dwell on Lucu's time as a child-worker in a sugar factory, elaborating on the proletariat's physical decline, but also on the studied, "genteel" decline of Lucu's aristocratic mother. A political substrate is added in chapters that mention the relative growth of Marxism among the more intellectual workers; Vlădescu is ambiguous in his sympathies: while Lucu the protagonist embraces communism, an endearing Jewish worker, Avram Calicul, is shown to be rejecting the very doctrine of class war as a reflex of man's animalization. As Platon writes: "Through Avram, Vlădescu’s novel contributes to the canon of 1930s–1940s political literature, a literature [otherwise] dominated by the debate of communism v. fascism."

=== Panning and conditional retirement ===
Both Menuetul and Moartea fratelui meu, which were immediate best-sellers, were adapted for the stage by the author himself. Both were rejected by the National Theater Bucharest, though a fragment of Menuetul, hosted by Ramuri in February 1937, earned praise in Familia for condensing "all that is fresh in the novel". During this period, Vlădescu also published translations, done from French literature or through French intermediaries: Henri Duvernois and Robert Dieudonné (La Guitare et le Jazz-band), Mikhail Artsybashev (Breaking Point), Fyodor Dostoyevsky (The Crocodile), and Mark Twain (The Prince and the Pauper). Vlădescu's pacifist and humanist themes are also given expression in a 1935 novel, Republica disperaților ("A Republic for the Desperate"), which has drawn comparisons to Franz Werfel's Class Reunion. In it, the conflicted jurist Ion Tartaru, who, after experiencing an unshakable disgust with bourgeois society, chances upon (what Platon calls) "a constellation of physical or social wrecks, who display more character than the pillars of society." Vârgolici disliked Republica's "utopian" language, its "annoying ideological inconsistency", as well as "prolix and monotonous" passages.

Vlădescu returned to the stage in late 1936, when Sandu Eliad's company, Renașterea, announced that it was rehearsing one of his plays, called Când părinții mănâncă aguridă ("When Parents Eat Verjuice Grapes"). Appearing in 1937, Început de viață ("Life Beginnings") was planned as the first novel of cycle called Gol ("Emptiness" or "Naked"). As rated by Baltazar, it is "a vast and copious fresco of our provinces", of the "petty and struggling world of the periphery" that Vlădescu was deeply familiarized with. The first protagonist, Ioniță Golăescu, is a man of uncertain parentage, a parvenu climbing out of the Lumpenproletariat, who uses other people's incompetence to his advantage. Due to a misprint, he can change his name to the prestigiously-sounding "Golescu", allowing him to be mistaken for an aristocrat in the fictional town of Balta; the second protagonist is his son, Remus Golescu, who rebels against such schemes, showing himself as a luminous figure who draws up plans for social reform.

Like Republica disperaților, Gol was widely panned by critics, who saw its attacks on high-society as extremely preachy. An exception to this consensus was Baltazar. He was impressed by the novel as a social tapestry, with a multitude of background characters that serve to illustrate complex, tragicomical situations—such as the burial of a demimondaine, who has been torn apart by feral dogs, and who has to have both Jewish and Christian burials (since her lovers and peers had never learned which group she belonged to). Another episode, praised by Baltazar as "high art", sketches the 1907 peasants' revolt. Cernea believes that the work is almost monographic, and that Balta is a good stand-in for any Western Moldavian târg. He also notes that Gol makes a seamless transition from narrations which are "soft, serene, sometimes monotonous", and which seem to contain Vlădescu's own speaking patterns, to scenes that would be "implausible" in real-life, but that Vlădescu manages to seem as "entirely credible."

In the late 1930s, Vlădescu became aware that royalties would never cover his basic expenses, and left Bucharest behind—according to the poet-memoirist Teodor Al. Munteanu, his first farm was somewhere near his birthplace, on land he had received from the 1920s land reform. According to Rădulescu, he had in fact returned to the civil service just outside Bucharest, serving a cultural adviser for Eugen Cialâc, the mayor of Călărași. The latter also intervened that his new protegé be granted farmland in Fundulea, where Vlădescu began raising chicken; he himself delivered eggs and other produce to Bucharest markets, and also began planning a topical novel, Viața păsărilor ("Life of Birds"). Calling this "my only refuge", he was additionally an archivist in Ialomița County, and, by his own account, did research into his history; his main work was for a literary review put out locally by Cialâc, named Pământul Nostru. During August 1939, Vlădescu was engaged in a major dispute with his editor, Petre Georgescu-Delafras, which threatened to split the community of writers along sentimental attachments. His grievances were mainly aired by Mircea Damian's daily, Fapta, causing Delafras' staunchest defenders to show their solidarity with a banquet honoring their chosen patron. Guests included the conservative critic I. E. Torouțiu and Mircea Eliade, who was at the time a young novelist.

=== World War II and communist takeover ===
The retired author lived through World War II: in January 1940, as still-neutral Romania was mobilizing its troops, he and N. I. Herescu obtained support for a charity called Oficiul Mezinilor ("Bureau for the Younger Sons"). Its mission was to distribute SSR funds specifically for children left destitute by the prolonged absence of a military-age brother. By March, the Ministry of Propaganda had made him editor of its magazine for the Romanian Land Forces, for which he reused the Sentinela title. For a while, he engaged in a publicized polemic with authors such as Radu D. Rosetti and Theodor Rășcanu, since they had (implicitly or explicitly) rejected his calls to contribute for free. The July issue had texts by Radu Gyr, Nicolae Iorga, Dumitru Iov, Păstorel Teodoreanu and I. Valerian, alongside drawings by Rădulescu and Ary Murnu.

Under Ion Antonescu's dictatorship, Vlădescu allowed a persecuted Jewish colleague, Marius Mircu, to use his signature on a novel called Rango (1942). The original Vlădescu was greatly affected by the aerial bombing of Bucharest, which gave him a heart disease. As noted by Rădulescu, his final living years became a "prolonged agony". He was nevertheless again a public figure after the anti-fascist coup of 1944. In February 1945, after having sold his estate, he was living at No. 8 on Bucharest's Finlanda Street—next to a younger colleague, Virgil Carianopol, who took his interview (only published in 1970). Herein, he spoke about his writing process, noting that he usually created characters from real-life examples, and that he thought of writing them as "talking to them." He believed that his literary disciples included Radu Boureanu, Zaharia Stancu, and Ladmiss Alexandrescu. He published a definitive edition of Republica disperaților in 1946, but also had many other fragments of planned novels in various stages of conception (some portions were published sporadically). A farce of his, called Cumnățica de la Iași ("Little Sister-in-Law from Iași"), was adapted into a radioplay by Elvira Dimitriu, airing on the national station in July 1946.

Living his final years under early Romanian communism, Vlădescu was read by the new critics through the lens of his proximity to proletarian literature. In early 1948, Radu Lupan catalogued Republica disperaților within a series of novels that portrayed the Lumpenproletariat, alongside similar works by N. D. Cocea, George Mihail Zamfirescu, and I. Peltz. He believed that these were all books in which the authors had taken "epic distance", demanded of them by the bourgeois ruling classes, resulting in "the systematic stifling of any attempt at an unmediated reflection of contemporary life within the writers' works." Vlădescu eventually withdrew back to his native region, at Dumitrești, where his much younger wife Eugenia worked as a judge. He died in that village on 29 March 1952, and was buried in the local Orthodox cemetery. He was outlived by Eugenia, and by Ionel, the son he had with her.

== Legacy ==
In a 1930s interview, Vlădescu had expressed the conviction that he would be forgotten, along with his entire generation. Revisiting this statement in 1992, scholar Mircea Anghelescu found it interesting that he acknowledged his limitations, and observed that he had been right when it came to his own legacy (he was "naïve and presently forgotten"). In a 1964 article aimed at ensuring leniency toward the humanist author, Vârgolici opined that Menuetul and Moartea fratelui meu were "the viable part of his work." Six years later, when he was himself interviewed regarding his role in the literary life, Carianopol reported still being pained whenever thinking about Vlădescu and his destiny. Moartea fratelui meu was reissued by Editura Dacia in 1971. Novelist Sorin Titel, who had been impressed by it upon reading it as a youth, was no longer even satisfied: he described the book as banal and "suffocated by sentimentalism", its denouement merely "confusing". The recovery effort was continued that decade: in 1972, Dumitrești had a literary circle named after the novelist.

Calls for revisiting Vlădescu's contribution were occasionally issued after the Romanian Revolution of 1989. During the early 2000s, Gramar publishers reissued Moartea fratelui meu on a collection of Romanian classical novels. As observed at the time by critic Ion Simuț, this was one of the "very debatable" inclusions in that series, with the text being "barely acceptable". At around the same time, philologist Valentin Tașcu intervened in the debates, writing that Vlădescu was being unjustly downsized not because he lacked talent or refinement, but because he had been too successful in his lifetime. In 2018, an anniversary year of the Great Union, Platon demanded that both Moartea fratelui meu and Republica disperaților be critically reconsidered as important contributions to the novelistic panorama of the event in question. He noted in that context: "To the common table of Romanian literature, G. M. Vlădescu brought more than a mere penny; he brought a talent." Revisiting Vlădescu's biography in 2020, Papuc nonetheless considered that he was "presently, quasi-unknown".
