= Aranfaybo =

Work of classical music scored for chamber orchestra

Aranfaybo is a work of classical music scored for chamber orchestra written by the Spanish composer and pianist Gustavo Díaz-Jerez. Aranfaybo was one of the gods in the mythology of the Bimbaches, aborigines of the island of El Hierro in the Canary Islands. Aranfaybo literally means "the one who produces rain". The Bimbaches offered animal sacrifices to invoke Aranfaybo in times of drought.

Together with Ymarxa, Ayssuragan, Chigaday, Azaenegue, Erbane and Guanapay, Aranfaybo is part of a cycle of seven orchestral works inspired in different places of each of the Canary Islands. Aranfaybo is a one-movement work lasting about 13 minutes, merging elements from spectralism and algorithmic procedures.

It was premiered on 19 November 2008 by the Hungarian Symphony Chamber Orchestra in Zagreb, Croatia under the baton of Alberto Roque. The piece was subsequently performed in eight other European countries (Eslovenia, Italy, Germany, Austria, Switzerland, Czech Republic, Slovakia, and Hungary). Its Spanish premiere took place on 12 November 2009 by the Symphonic Orchestra of Tenerife, with Lü Jia conducting, during the inaugural concert of the newly refurbished concert hall at the University of La Laguna. One day later, the Symphonic Orchestra of Tenerife opened its 2009–2010 season with a performance of the work at the Auditorium Adán Martín of Santa Cruz de Tenerife, also with Lü Jia conducting.
