= Theodor Rășcanu =

Romanian writer and political figure (1888–1952)

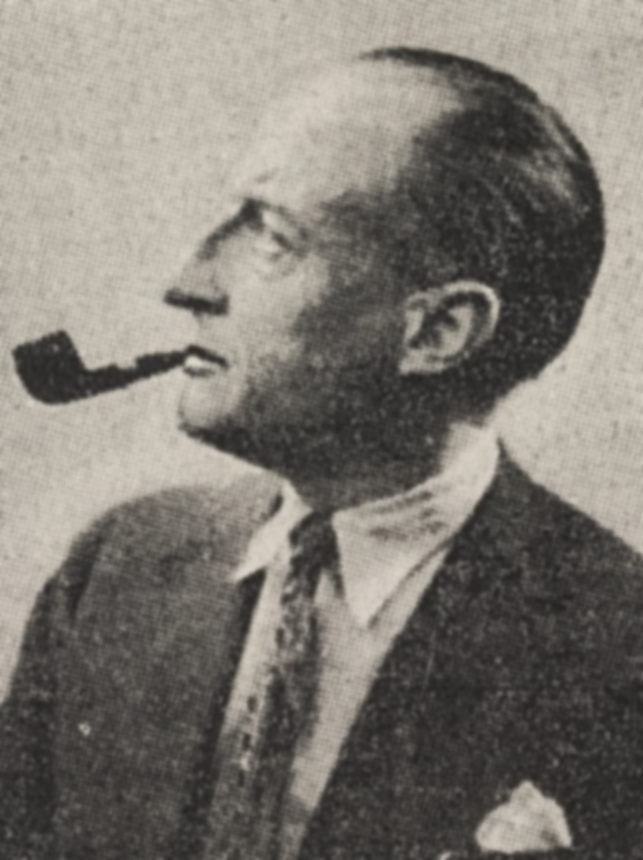
- Rășcanu in 1935
- Born: 4 November 1888; Iași, Kingdom of Romania
- Died: 29 July 1952 (aged 63); Vaslui, Romanian People's Republic
- Occupations: Lawyer; politician; editor; translator; social scientist; landowner
- Writing career
- Period: 1904–1948
- Genres: Essay; social novel; biographical novel; historical novel; family saga; psychological novel; roman à clef; satire; feuilleton; memoir; short story; novella; lyric poetry; sonnet; formes fixes
- Movements: Neo-romanticism; Social realism

Theodor August Rășcanu, also credited as Teodor Râșcanu or Rîșcanu (4 November 1888 – 29 July 1952), was a Romanian novelist, historian and poet, also noted for his involvement with groups on the right and far-right of the political spectrum. He was born into the boyar class of Western Moldavia, whose social history is a main topic of his prose; he was related to several figures of note, including Alexandru Ioan Cuza, a founding figure of the united Romanian state. His own childhood witnessed the final stage of the aristocracy's decline, and he theorized early on that its misfortunes were intimately connected with a rise in Jewish immigration. Despite his early interest in politics, and his 1910s recruitment by the Conservative Party, Rășcanu's first published works were poems, including a large number of sonnets. Such contributions were generally ignored by critics, as was his 1925 debut as a social novelist. Meantime, he served as a volunteer in the Second Balkan War, and, despite his qualms about Romania's support for the Entente powers, also fought in World War I.

Rășcanu's own magazine, Politica and Gândul Liber, sketched out his ideological approach to Romanian issues, as did his surviving thesis of political economy. His judgments passed into a succession of interwar novels, as well as into his articles for various newspapers. He reached literary significance in 1932 with Ileana Lupului, which, though still seen by critics as somewhat clumsy, impressed with its psychological perspective on the rural soul. Promoția '907, appearing as a feuilleton in 1935, was censored due to its unflattering depiction of Greater Romania's political and literary elites. After openly defying the left-wing Poporanists, Rășcanu also embraced anti-communism, and for a while corresponded with the more senior anti-Soviet intellectual, Panait Istrati. Still a self-confessed antisemite, he enlisted in the National-Christian Defense League, and was afterwards a collaborator, as well as briefly a member, of the fascist Iron Guard; however, he was treated with suspicion in these circles, because of his willingness to acknowledge Jewish contributions on the frontlines. From 1934, he also asked Romanians to refrain from blaming foreigners for all their woes.

By the start of World War II, Rășcanu returned with a celebrated biography of his royal cousin. He was reputedly jaded in early 1941, when Ion Antonescu's government repressed the Iron Guard. After Antonescu had engaged Romania on the Eastern Front, he immersed himself in his literary work, printing or merely announcing various episodes from his own family saga. His family estate in Vaslui County, reduced by a 1920s land reform, then damaged by a 1940 earthquake, was ransacked during the Soviet occupation. Rășcanu sold his reduced property and moved around the country, hoping to escape arrest by the newly proclaimed communist regime. He died in Vaslui, possibly by suicide; he remained forgotten into the 1980s, his work only partially recovered and reconsidered after the end of communism.

== Biography ==
=== Origins and childhood ===
The writer was born at Iași, in the Kingdom of Romania's Western-Moldavian half, on 4 November 1888 (17 November New Style). The family lived out in Drăgușeni, but rented the Iamandi house in Iași specifically so that he could be born there. He was then taken to Drăgușeni, but had his first memories from Nice, where he wintered with his parents in 1891–1892. His father, August, was a member of the landed gentry in Vaslui County, while his mother, Maria, was born into a Trifești branch of the Ghica family. Theodor and his magistrate brother Eduard were thus linked on both sides to the boyar aristocracy of old Moldavia. They were great-grandsons of Iordachi Rășcanu, who had served as Vornic in the 1820s, and grandsons of Toderiță, who had taken part, as an exile liberal, in the French Revolution of 1848. The Rășcanus, first attested in the 17th century, divided themselves early on into clans of boyars and peasants. One of these branches remained in Bessarabia, which was annexed by the Russian Empire after an 1812 treaty. Parallel research by scholar Gheorghe Ghibănescu noted that these socially stratified branches had lost contact with each other, and no longer viewed themselves as related. The Rășcanus' fully yeoman side included its own set of notabilities—such as diplomat Constantin Langa-Rășcanu, and two generals: Ioan Rășcanu and Constantin Vasiliu-Rășcanu.

The writer himself acknowledged that one of his grandmothers, Penelopi Eliadis, was of Greek ethnicity. He took more pride in noting that his mother's family was related to the Cuza dynasty through Tudosica, the wife of an 18th-century Paharnic and conspirator, Ioniță Cuza. As mentioned by genealogist Mihai Sorin Rădulescu, he was related to that clan in other ways as well: his great-great-grandmother, Paraschiva Lambrino, wife of Vornic Constantin (died 1828), was a matrilineal Cuza (through her, he also had genealogical links to Miron Costin, the pioneer Moldavian historian). Nonetheless, and against the Cuzas' agenda, grandfather Toderiță had spent his final years opposing the unionist movement, specifically by demanding that Moldavia be kept independent of Wallachia. His virulent resistance to the agenda came even as Alexandru Ioan Cuza had emerged as Domnitor of the unified state (1859–1866). Theodor and Eduard were the Domnitor's first cousins once removed. Their maternal great-uncle was Calinic Miclescu, who, shortly before the novelist's birth, was serving as Orthodox Metropolitan-Primate; an uncle was the politician Leon Bogdan.

Rășcanu's father died in 1892, and Maria sold Drăgușeni to liquidate her debt, taking her son to Iași. They rented the Goldenthal house on Mârzescu Street, which he later described as mice-infested. It was also in close proximity to the Notre Dame de Sion, a Catholic school that he described as bleak. His mother attempted to have him enlist there, but he fled after one day (preserving from this episode a lifelong rejection of total institutions). Once the family had moved into a better lodging in Păcurari ward (where he lived between 1895 and 1912), his education was handled by private tutors. He learned Russian (having been "stricken by Russophilia" after a visit to Odessa) alongside French, and also took up fencing. Finally enlisted at the National College, he was put into remedial class, then withdrawn and tutored for another five years, before finally returning as a student for the three final years.

With his classmates, Rășcanu issued in 1904 the magazine Spre Lumină ("Into the Light"), where he also published his first poems. The same pieces were collected in 1906 as a volume called Pagini intime ("Intimate Pages"); a second volume, announced as Clipele de aur ("Gilded Moments"), never saw print. Literary historian Victor Durnea sees the cycle as a talentless exercise in neo-romantic imitation, with heavy borrowings from George Coșbuc and more discreet ones from Vasile Alecsandri and Mihai Eminescu. Pagini intime was nonetheless praised by traditionalist reviewers of the day, including Nicolae Iorga and Sextil Pușcariu. The self-conscious Rășcanu made only small contributions to poetry after 1906. In addition to his own pieces done in formes fixes or as sonnets, he did translations from the more difficult authors of Parnassian and Symbolist Frenchmen—Paul Bourget, José-Maria de Heredia, Leconte de Lisle, and Henri de Régnier.

=== Political debut ===
In 1905, Maria could afford to purchase a new estate, at Buhăiești. According to an October 1937 letter to Iorga, Rășcanu vacationed there for long intervals. This early experience made him into a self-confessed antisemite and Romanian nationalist, since he blamed an "invasion" of Jewish immigrants for the region's changing fortunes. In early 1907, he personally witnessed the events that led up to a massive peasant revolt. As he observed in 1936, many authors had pinned these events down on the class of Jewish tenants and exploiters, which were "a neurosis, but not a source". He disagreed with antisemites on this point, blaming instead the opposition National Liberal Party (PNL), who, he argued, was interested in gaining power at all cost. He also wrote about how Jewish tenants had been scapegoated in the process, citing the case of his mother's own lessees. Both of them had been seriously injured by the rebels, and had to flee with her to Iași.

Later in 1907, Rășcanu enlisted at the University of Iași department of law. During this interval, he published his prose in periodicals that included Conservatorul, Evenimentul, Mișcarea, Universul, and A. C. Cuza's Unirea. He graduated in 1910, when he also joined the Conservative Party. He was admitted into the bar association and set up a practice in Păcurari, but immediately after moved to Bucharest, where he lived for a while in the civil servants' palace on Victory Square. From May 1912, he was secretary of Vaslui County Council, resigning just one year into his office. He only rarely worked as an attorney, but took his PhD with a thesis of political economy, Problema pământului în România ("The Land Issue in Romania", printed 1922). In March 1913, Unirea hosted his critique of the moderate-liberal press, including Adevărul of Bucharest, which he described as manipulated by Jewish interests. He believed that his stance on limiting Jewish emancipation had been backed by the Romanian King, Carol I, who had advised against changes to the 1866 constitution.

In 1912, the young man had completed a patriotic novella, Românca ("The Romanian Lady"), asking his dramatist uncle, Jean Miclescu, to arrange that it be published in the Conservatives' cultural tribune, Convorbiri Literare. Miclescu apparently lost the manuscript, which was never recovered. In early 1913, Rășcanu was persuaded by another one of his uncles, Eduard Ghica, to join the PNL. He returned to the Conservatives after only a few months. In summer, he volunteered for the Romanian Land Forces, which had been engaged in the Second Balkan War, and was assigned to the 8th Artillery Regiment. His book of memoirs from this campaign was printed in 1914. He was occasionally featured, with historical research, in Sever Zotta's Arhiva Genealogică, and had also managed to be welcomed by Adevărul. In November 1913, the latter daily hosted his editorial, warning peasants not to trust promises of a land reform, as advanced by the opposition PNL, suggesting that, in a repeat of 1907, they were only issued only to stir up riots against the Conservative cabinet. Soon after, Rășcanu began writing political articles in Cuvântul, a regional mouthpiece of Virgil Arion's Conservative dissidence (where he was also editor), then founded his own magazine, Politica ("Politics"), which he edited throughout its first series (1914–1916). To disguise that Politica was also nearly entirely written by him, he used pseudonyms such as Criton and Dinu Buhuș. The editorial office was located in Iași, at 25 Catagiu Avenue—an apartment that he shared with his mother until she died in 1920.

On 5 May 1914, Rășcanu presented himself for the scheduled legislative election, contesting an Assembly seat in Vaslui County's third college. The two seats in that precinct respectively went to Vasile Sassu of the PNL and to a Conservative man, Virgil Mironescu. During the early stages of World War I, as Romania preserved neutrality, he followed the debates between partisans of the Entente powers, who envisaged unification with the Romanian subjects of Austria-Hungary, and "Germanophiles"—as those who endorsed the Central Powers had become known. Initially, he favored the former camp, since he believed that Romania's main enemy was Austria-Hungary, which stood to be destroyed in the war; he was also convinced that German militarism was directly threatening his own country's agenda. In November 1914, he handed in his resignation from the Conservative Party, rejecting the Germanophile positions of its leader, Alexandru Marghiloman. He referred specifically to his own support for Greater Romania (as "integral Romanianism"), accusing Marghiloman of having repressed that cherished cause, and "my own dignity as a Romanian". He was still politically independent in 1915.

=== 1916–1918 campaign and Gândul Liber ===
Rășcanu's politics in late 1914 brought him into permanent contact with the Ententist left-wingers at Adevărul at Dimineața. In December, the latter recommended Politica as a great read, in particular due to its "fine and interesting" article by Alexandru D. Xenopol. The twin papers' publisher, Constantin Mille, was in turn praised in Politica as one of the greatest figures in Romanian journalism—Rășcanu saw Mille as a modern-day Ion Heliade Rădulescu or Cezar Bolliac. This stance irritated A. C. Cuza, who had moved to the far-right; in Unirea, he informed Rășcanu that such stances were imprudent and compromising. Almost immediately after, Rășcanu had a publicized break with Mille's gazettes, both of which accused him of being a libel extortionist. According to these now-hostile sources, he and the "non-existent" Politica had sought to influence the 1914 elections in Vaslui County's first college, promising to support George Mavrocordat in exchange for a 500-lei bribe. The account, said to have been backed by an eyewitness, was proclaimed by Dimineața as factual after Rășcanu, claimed to have been panicking, donated the exact sum to Familia Luptătorilor charity.

Rășcanu responded in February 1915 with an open letter carried by Viitorul, a PNL daily. Therein, he described Mille as a "prisoner" of Jewish staffers, primarily including brothers Emil Fagure and Albert Honigman. He also stated his own claims against Adevărul, implying that its content had been sponsored by a foreign embassy. Mille pressed him to detail that claim. In his reply, Rășcanu stated that he knew from Grigore Carp (son of the Conservative doyen Petre P. Carp) that Mille was taking bribes from Russian diplomats, and laundering them through Marmorosch Blank Bank. All those implicated by him reportedly denied the charges, prompting Mille to conclude that Rășcanu had a diminished intellect, and to accuse Viitorul of libel. Rășcanu was then approached in Union Square by Carp, resulting in what PNL newspapers described as "a fierce altercation". In April, he apologized to Cuza, now rating Mille as "a mediocrity". He himself had by then changed course in matters of geopolitics, publishing Germanophile articles the nationally circulated Seara, and also in his own Politica.

In late 1916, once Romania had entered the war as an Entente country, Rășcanu overcame his reluctance. Though he sometimes listed as a volunteer in the subsequent campaigns, he once clarified that he only returned as a conscript. On 9 September, he announced with a letter in Opinia of Iași that Politica had suspended itself for the duration of the war, and his own military service. As he put it at the time: "now that Romania has taken a decision, all Romanian souls have a sacred duty to come together as one. [...] Victory above all!" It remains poorly attested whether he served in the Transylvanian incursion, though he is known to have been there for the operational collapse that followed, which saw Romania losing Bucharest. He and his regiment managed to withdraw, along with the surviving troops and the Romanian administration, into Western Moldavia, where they continued to mount the defense until a separate peace in May 1918. A liaison officer, he claimed to have been decorated for his actions during the Battle of Mărășești.

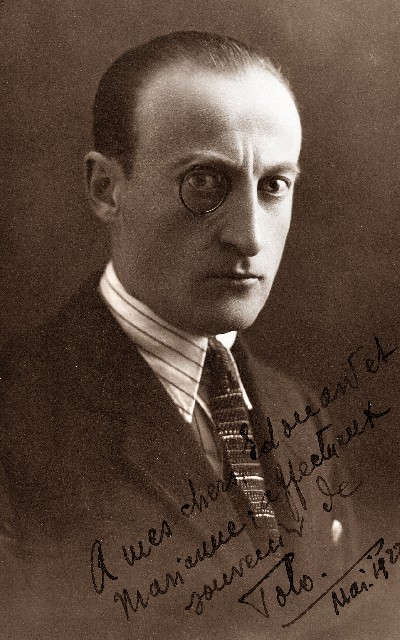
Rășcanu c. 1923

The collapse of the Central Powers in November 1918 also signaled a change of fortunes for Romania; the country reentered the war, ensuring the effective creation of Greater Romania. Rășcanu could also return to politics: shunning the Conservatives, he was admitted into Alexandru Averescu's People's League, though he never managed to advance internally; he also reissued Politica, now titled Gândul Liber ("The Free Thought"), until 1920. In its March 1920 issue, he challenged the tenets of Poporanism, which had become dominant on Iași's political-literary scene. His manifesto, seen by his colleagues at Opinia as "rather drastic", called out Poporanist novels as tendentious as pointless, adding: "to have read just one is to have read all of them."

After being fully orphaned, Rășcanu sold his Iași properties and moved as a tenant in Bucharest. He lived mostly at Excelsior Hotel, making frequent returns to Buhăiești. He lost much of his family land in the mass redistribution of 1922, which he continued to regard as a "demagogic" initiative. He still owned a pavilion in Buhăiești, and reported feeling enraged by the view—with "the kike Schimsehensohn's" villa, once owned by a Romanian entrepreneur, always in sight; he also noted that many plots, including those once owned by his various relatives in Frenciugi and elsewhere, had been acquired by Jewish businessmen, who he equally resented.

=== Ileana Lupului period ===
In the early interwar, Rășcanu was sporadically active as a writer, with short pieces appearing in Adevărul Literar și Artistic, Răsăritul, and Dacia, and with the rather more permanent "letters from the Capital" hosted in Iași's daily, Lumea. Dacia serialized his second written (and first published) novella, Henrietta, which he later came to regard as an unsatisfying experiment. He only debuted as a novelist in 1925, with Aceea care trebuia iubită ("She Who Should Have Been Loved"). Rădulescu finds that the work was correctly ignored by reviewers, since it was mediocre, with an "unnatural denouement." According to Durnea, its wartime setting creates false expectations, while the central plot "schematized" as an amorous intrigue; much of the text is political commentary, justifying Germanophilia and censuring the moral failings of real-life politicians. The story called O vară la țară ("A Summer in the Country"), hosted by Adevărul Literar și Artistic, led him to be sued by a man who happened to have the same name as one of the characters. The affair came before a tribunal in 1926, but was dismissed, since Rășcanu had had "no felonious intent".

The period witnessed his tangential involvement in political debates. In May 1925, he sided with N. D. Cocea, the founder of Facla daily, and against Pamfil Șeicaru of Cuvântul. At issue was Cocea's republican activism, which clashed with Șeicaru's ultra-conservative monarchism; in addition to recalling that Șeicaru had been a radical in the 1910s, Rășcanu observed that republicanism was a natural evolution, which could be expected to take hold of Romania as well. In November, Averescu's Îndreptarea hosted a Rășcanu essay, which targeted the rival Peasants' Party. An unsigned rebuttal was featured in the Peasantist Aurora; it noted that there was no point in engaging Rășcanu, since he fed on attention. Aurora also claimed that it had had to reject an "immense number of articles" that Rășcanu had sent in, adding: "That poor man must be very upset with us". In mid-1927, Rășcanu was attested as an activist of the PNL, albeit one who took controversial positions. Writing for Chemarea, he claimed that the head of the local party chapter, Vasile Sassu, had attempted to murder a local political boss, Colonel Dumitru Hotnog. Sassu took him to court.

In 1929, after incurring financial losses in the Great Depression, Rășcanu could no longer afford to leave Buhăiești, where he spent the next four years. By December 1931, Rășcanu was exchanging letters with the novelist and activist Panait Istrati. The latter, once a famous communist writer, had turned into a leading critic of the Soviet Union; Istrati advised his younger colleague not to expect that he could live on writing alone. In mid-1930, Rășcanu had announced that he had completed a French translation of Theodor Scorțescu's novella, Popi, as well as his own "novel about life in the country, its name yet undecided."

One such novel was serialized in Dreptatea in 1932 as Ileana Lupului, carrying the name of a secondary character. In addition to being peasant-focused, it had elements of a police procedural: Safta, who has married for wealth, tries to murder her husband Tănasă, but instead accidentally kills Ileana, her own mother; she resolves to frame Tănasă, and carries the secret to her deathbed. According to Rădulescu, it is proof of Rășcanu's talent, offering realistic glimpses of Moldavian peasant life in the fin de siècle. On the left, Petre Pandrea was less impressed, suggesting that Ileana Lupului was wavering "between the standards of photography and a clumsy delineation of uncharacteristically selected realities." Pandrea believes that, like Victor Ion Popa, Rășcanu was borrowing heavily from Năpasta, which is remembered as the only tragedy ever written by Ion Luca Caragiale, and which opened up new venues in rural-themed prose—all such works contrast the "profound suffering" of toiling peasants with the "ungraceful superficiality" of other classes. As read by him, Ileana Lupului remains valid as a damning critique of the "liberal state" and its oligarchy, for showing how peasants treated these remote institutions with "that old oriental distrust".

=== From LANC to anti-Nazism ===
A general note of Rășcanu's prose, as defined by fellow genealogist Gheorghe G. Bezviconi, is a contrast between his political texts, which are "harsh and edgy", and his outlining of historical subjects, where he is always "fine and subtle". Rășcanu was more active in the literary field during the 1930s and throughout the early stages of World War II. His work was carried in Revista Fundațiilor Regale, Viața Romînească, Credința, Din Trecutul Nostru, Magazin, Reporter, and in Constantin Gane's Sânzana. He was unusually present in the left-of-center paper, Cuvântul Liber, but used this venue to advocate for A. C. Cuza. By April 1935, when he was admitted into the Romanian Writers' Society, he had announced his intention to publish several new books. These included a poetry volume, Numai sonete ("Only Sonnets"), a collection of stories named Blana de lup ("The Wolf Pelt"), as well as two novels—Vârtejul ("The Whirlwind") and Promoția '907 ("Class of '07"). Only the latter came out, originally as the feuilleton of Epoca (1935). It is described by Durnea as a roman à clef, but also as a relative failure—its loose "biographical sketches" of Rășcanu's contemporaries are often tinged by resentments. Through heavy satire, the book airs its author's conflicts with Șeicaru, Alfred Hefter, Victor Iamandi, I. Peltz, Păstorel Teodoreanu, and Ion Vinea. Its publication was ended abruptly when some of the novel's characters intervened to stop it.

Rășcanu's already stated nationalism had become more radical during those years. Ahead of the legislative elections in June 1931, he had joined Cuza's National-Christian Defense League (LANC), and ended up headlining its Assembly list in Vaslui County. For a while during the count, he was viewed as a likely winner of the fourth deputy seat. Also a leader of the LANC's county chapter, he presented his resignation from the group later that year. As he explained to Dimineața, he felt that he and other LANC men had lost through massive electoral fraud, and that Cuza had betrayed him by agreeing to recognize the count. Before repeat elections in July 1932, he had joined to the National Agrarian Party (PNA), again headlining his home list. He was also enlisted with the Iron Guard, which had split from the LANC. Before the actual vote, he resigned the PNA and ended up as a Guardist candidate.

Rășcanu was afterwards independent of all political parties, to at least 1936. In 1933, Ion Scutaru, who had established a new daily called Voința, invited him back to Bucharest. Therein, he castigated the Romanian far-right for its embrace of Nazi Germany. He saw Nazism as a revived pan-Germanism, and therefore as a bane for Romania's continued existence. The newspaper filed for bankruptcy soon after, but Rășcanu no longer left the capital, where he mostly lived in rented apartments on Mussolini Street. As he recalled in 1937, he had to change address several times because of adversity caused by his genealogical articles, which had been taken up in Sandu Tudor's Credința. Also on Mussolini Street, he finished a novel, Pui de cuc ("Cuckoo in the Nest"), which he presented to Ignaz Herz's publishing house— where it remained as a galley proof, without him being informed as to why.

In his 1934 contributions to Curentul, Rășcanu challenged the hardline-nationalist editorial line. He criticized calls for Romanianization measures, feeling that Jews and Hungarians for all political and economic troubles were being deceitful or unrealistic—citing the then-notorious "Škoda Affair", whose perpetrators were members of the native elites; instead of Romanization, he now proposed soul-searching, re-professionalization, and moral integrity. His own "honest principles" were publicly welcomed by a Jewish journalist, László Baradlai, who also picked up clues that Curentul did not either endorse it or want it publicized. In tandem, he continued writing for the comparatively liberal Revista Fundațiilor Regale, which published another one of his Balkan-War recollections in mid-1935. The piece was censured by the LANC newspaper, Porunca Vremii, because it discussed acts of heroism by Jewish soldiers.

=== Mid-1930s positions ===
In May 1934, Rășcanu had invited Istrati to visit him in Buhăiești. In his reply, Istrati declined the invitation, and excused himself from a demand that he help promote Ileana Lupului internationally, informing Rășcanu that he was terminally ill. He died soon after, by which time his friend was considering translating his main novel, Thistles of the Baragan, from French into Istrati's native Romanian. As he reported in Tribuna, he had to give up, as no publisher would touch it. Rășcanu himself experimented with anti-communist literature, but did so in an unprecedented manner. In 1936, Universul's almanac hosted his Cocoșii colectivi ("Collectivist Cockerels"), which was almost entirely plagiarized from an episode in Virgin Soil Upturned, by the Soviet author Mikhail Sholokhov. Rășcanu changed the target of Sholokhov's satire, which was the Left Opposition, aiming it instead at kolkhozes and at Marxism–Leninism as a whole.

Rășcanu was again moving toward antisemitic fascism by July 1936—that month, his estate served as a camping and training site for the Iron Guard. He was personally present, alongside his relatives, for a Guardist "consecration of the colors" ceremony that was held there. Reconciling with Porunca Vremii, he now suggested articles on the Soviet anti-religious campaign (which, he claimed, had destroyed most churches but had spared the synagogues), on Fyodor Dostoevsky's antisemitism, on the recruitment of Jewish cadres by Romania's National Peasants' Party (PNȚ). Later that month, the newspaper hosted his text about "the kikes in literature", which proposed that any Jews of merit, from Jesus to Albert Einstein, had not acted as Jews, and that any other talents, such as Benjamin Disraeli, were mediocre when compared to Christian colleagues. He therefore declared that Jewish writers had only contributed "gibberish, pornography, ramblings, [and] bullshit."

In tandem, however, the writer maintained contacts with the left-wing newspapers. In August 1936, C. Săteanu of Adevărul advertised Rășcanu's intention of publishing a new biography of Petre P. Carp, using "extensive source material" from his personal collection. He was also focused on exposing malfeasance by his fellow Romanians in his native region. In October, the first page of Facla (now managed by Vinea) was reserved for an exchange of letters between Rășcanu and Mircea Cancicov, who was serving as Finance Minister in a PNL cabinet. When Cancicov dismissed his reports about widespread fraud in Buhăiești, he argued that the investigative protocol was structurally deficient. A month later, as the local elections unfolded, he was accused by the PNȚ, and by his former colleagues as Dreptatea, of having masterminded violence in Buhăiești; his critics also claimed that he was acting on behalf of Cuza's new fascist group, the National Christian Party (PNC). He denied that this was the case, insisting that he was not present in Buhăiești at the time, and that he no longer identified with "the Cuzaists". The claim was partly confirmed in March 1937 by a sympathetic note in Adevărul, which characterized him as a recluse, who had parted with politics even as his Problema pământului was being reread "in Moscow as well as in Berlin."

Returning to Facla, Rășcanu declared that as an intelligent person could chose to be neither a leftist nor a rightist, neither a "Shabbos goy" nor an antisemite. He shared the Romanians' fears about Hungarian irredentism, but optimistically argued, again in Facla, that the naturalized and land-endowed Hungarian peasants, as represented by Imre Réthy, would naturally prefer Romanian rule over annexation by a plutocratic Hungary. In his 1937 letter to Iorga, he advocated for solving the "Jewish question" through mass expropriations, which would have resulted in the land going back to Christians. He now believed that this plan could only be enacted by Iorga and his Democratic Nationalist Party. Also then, he reported his satisfaction that "[Bucharesters] are now more antisemitic than the people of Iași, since Bucharest too has been conquered by the Jews."

=== FRN and National Legionary State ===
After a new round of elections in 1937, King Carol II assigned power to the PNC, which formed a monarchist-and-antisemitic cabinet. In January 1938, as a columnist for Patria (put out by the National Liberal Party-Brătianu), Rășcanu covered statements issued by the Iron Guard's Captain, Corneliu Zelea Codreanu, who was in the opposition to the PNC. Though he praised Codreanu's "purity of thought", he expressed concern over the Guard's foreign policy, which sought to immediately align Romania with the Axis powers. As Rășcanu remonstrated, this goal, why not necessarily undesirable, was too imprudent. He then censured the Romanian parties for their swift and, in his view, implausible conversion to antisemitism. He cautioned that the Jews, while indeed "too numerous" and treated with indulgence for far too long, were again being scapegoated for issues that had been the Romanians' own doing.

Rășcanu mocked the PNC's dissolution of the elected legislature, viewing it as a proof that the Cuzaists were simply applying tried and tested methods in politicking. He still approved of government when it proceeded to ban Adevărul, referring to its writers as the "Judeologists" of corrupt democracy, and cautioning the authorities that they had migrated to another paper, Semnalul. He himself again slipped out from political journalism as Carol II staged a self-coup—the parties were outlawed, and the more compliant politicians joined a National Renaissance Front (FRN). His literary reconstructions of historical facts culminated with a 1939 quasi-novel, Ruginoasa—focusing on Alexandru Ioan Cuza's troubled reign, and named after his country estate. Rădulescu sees this book as Rășcanu's masterpiece, capturing the "unmistakable charm" of its subjects' biographies. In January 1939, Rășcanu joined the FRN as part of a mass recruitment among Writers' Society members. By September, he had withdrawn to the countryside, and was working on a novel called Comoara lui Drăgan ("Drăgan's Treasure"), said by Universul Literar to have been about a peasant who unexpectedly becomes a landed magnate. The same magazine announced that it would be handling a feuilleton publication of Puiul de cuc.

During that year, Rășcanu had a dispute with Petre Andrei, the FRN Minister of Education, who was changing the names of educational institutions named after donors. Rășcanu protested, since these included a Buhăiești school honoring his mother. In September, he was hosted in Ion Gigurtu's Libertatea with an essay that asked whether the US-based Peter Neagoe should be seen as a "Romanian writer". Around that time, he was focusing on analyzing an edition of Aurel Popovici's political manifesto, Vereinigten Staaten von Gross-Österreich (originally published in 1906), as translated and edited by Petre Pandrea in 1938. He attacked the latter as a falsifier: according to his research, Pandrea had habitually changed references to the Duchy of Bukovina and had made them seem to be about Romania, so as to make it seem that Popovici had wanted all Romanians unified inside the Habsburg monarchy. In March 1940, after still-neutral Romania had ordered a general mobilization of its troops, Rășcanu asked in Semnalul that a propaganda magazine for the soldiers be issued. He was then chided by his colleague G. M. Vlădescu, who argued that he Santinela already existed for this purpose, and that Rășcanu himself had been asked to write for it (before stonewalling the invitation).

In July 1940, Rășcanu deplored the cession of Bessarabia to the Soviets, but asked the Romanian public to maintain its faith in the king, "our great leader". For most of the world-war period, he was editor of a Bucharest daily, Acțiunea, where he also published his memoirs and historical studies. Founded on 5 September 1940, by C. T. Bobe, this daily announced shortly after that the FRN had been dissolved, and that General Ion Antonescu had been granted dictatorial powers. Initially, Antonescu invited in the Iron Guard, which formed a "National Legionary State"; Acțiunea immediately adapted itself to the ideological shift. According to scholar Constantin Bostan, Rășcanu and Bezviconi both cheered for the Guardist regime, and were depressed in January 1941, after the Guard was chased out and repressed by Antonescu.

=== Antonescu regime ===
Before and after the second Antonescu takeover, Rășcanu was also a somewhat regular contributor to Șeicaru and Vinea's Evenimentul Zilei, to the central daily Viața, as well as to magazines such as Săptămâna CFR and Gazeta Refugiaților. He made a belated return to Unirea where, on Easter Day 1941, he expressed his full support for the Conducător, proposing that all Romanians needed to rally around him. In June, Romania entered Operation Barbarossa, and the world conflict, as a Nazi ally, rapidly reannexing Bessarabia. Rășcanu celebrated this victory, as well as the subsequent Siege of Odessa, arguiong that the latter had ensured a "definitive amputation" of Soviet expansionism.

Also in 1941, Rășcanu published a social novel called Banul... ochiul dracului ("Money Is... the Devil's Eye"). As Durnea observes, it combined tropes borrowed from Iorga's Sămănătorul school (such as having a wholly positive boyar as its main character) with social realism à la Liviu Rebreanu. Both comparisons had been made by various contemporaries. The Sămănătorist label enraged Rășcanu, who asked that he be understood as a disciple of Caragiale and Rebreanu's. The latter claim was ridiculed in Porunca Vremii by Marin Sârbulescu ("N. Olt"), who asserted that Rășcanu was rather on par with Nicolae G. Rădulescu-Niger—their productions being unremarkable, "sluggish", and disposable. The senior novelist followed up in 1942 with Dragostea în furtună ("Love within the Storm"), an updated, modified version of Aceea care trebuia iubită. Celebrating Romanian rule over Bessarabia, he announced that he was also preparing an ample novel on the Bessarabian Rășcanus. Instead, honoring a decades-long demand by Ilarie Chendi, he published in 1943 a romanticized biography of the Moldavian poet Alexandru Hrisoverghi. As Durnea observes, it is a rather conventional, "bourgeois" yarn. By contrast, Rădulescu was impressed with its "savory narrative".

During the final year of Antonescu's rule, Rășcanu was coming to be ridiculed by young journalists. In March 1944, he sent a biography of Ion Neculce to be published by a central newspaper, only to be rejected as a plagiarist of George Călinescu. The devastating earthquake of November 1940 had damaged the Buhăiești manor, and its pavilion had been torn down by 1942—leaving the Rășcanus with the more solidly built annexes and a surrounding park. Romania's eastern campaign ended during 1944, following an anti-fascist coup that August. This ran parallel to the Soviet entry into Iași, and was followed by generalized occupation of Romania. Between these events, the Red Army troops occupying Buhăiești reportedly incited the local peasantry, which then ransacked Rășcanu's manor. In 1984, literary historian Mircea Ciubotaru observed that the building had ceased existing after 1944; Rășcanu also reported that his entire library had been destroyed that year, albeit without detailing the cause. The former landowner was pushed to sell what was left of his property, moving into a new home in Roșiorii de Vede.

=== Communist-era downfall ===
In September 1944, Timpul daily hosted Rășcanu's musings about Russian literature, which began by deploring its complete removal from Romanian translation projects "in the last 10–12 years of militaristic dictatorship". He proposed investments in familiarizing Romanians with Dostoevsky, Leo Tolstoy, and eventually also Mikhail Sholokhov. He also made returns to the topic of agricultural policy, as with a March 1946 article in Drapelul. While accepting the need for additional expropriations, he stated his belief that estates would be replaced by a network of industrialized farms, state-subsidized and regulated.

The revived PNȚ and its Dreptatea were informed in April 1946 that Rășcanu, "the ex-Germanophile, the ex-hooligan [...] is nowadays using an evening paper to state his pro-Soviet personal creed." Dreptatea saw this as a "belated and deplorable" conversion, stating amazement that Rășcanu had not yet been purged out of the profession. He was sometimes hosted in Era Nouă of Bucharest. In May 1946, it featured his musings on racism, described by him as "stupid and stultifying"; following Giorgio Pasquali, he suggested that no race was pure—though adding that the "Semites" came closest, and could be somewhat justified in adopting racism. Before a complete takeover by the Romanian Communist Party, he could still publish his articles, continuing at Era Nouă, and also being co-opted by Provincia of Turnu Severin. The latter hosted some fragments of Pui de cuc—specifically, the more documentary chapters, described by Rădulescu as reliable depictions of Moldavian provincial life in the 1910s and 1920s. Provincia also interviewed Rășcanu in February 1947, allowing him to propose a regime of creative freedom.

At Era Nouă, Rășcanu also stood out with his unusually harsh verdicts about the poet Constantin Fântâneru, who had once been a comrade inside the far-right movement, but had since suffered a mental collapse. While communists such as Oscar Lemnaru and Adrian Rogoz expressed pity for their destitute foe, Rășcanu mocked him, suggesting that, since he still "has his arms and legs", he should have been fine. During the communist regime's earliest years, Rășcanu himself moved to Vaslui, away from public scrutiny, in hopes of escaping looming persecution. He was allowed to lecture at a communist event in January 1948, condemning "American imperialism". In an October overview of new works thematically linked to the Moldavian Revolution of 1848, columnist Octav Șuluțiu mentioned that Rășcanu was in the process of writing one such book, Răzvrătitul Toderiță ("Toderiță the Rebel"). Șuluțiu commented that "nothing is known to us yet" about the novel's content, beyond its "center of gravity". His fate is not precisely know beyond the date of his death (29 July 1952); posthumous accounts mentioned by Durnea report that, upon realizing that he would be arrested, Rășcanu resorted to committing suicide. Rădulescu does not mention a cause of death, simply observing that Rășcanu had "passed into the realm of shadows" in 1952.

== Legacy ==
For some five decades, Rășcanu's work as a novelist went unmentioned in Romanian reference works. In 1962, while describing Sholokhov as a model to follow for Romania's own socialist-realists, philologist Gheorghe Barbă revisited and condemned Cocoșii colectivi. He included Rășcanu among "the petty scribes on the bourgeoisie's payroll". The relaxation of pressures under the later stages of communism also allowed for some reexamination of his role in Romanian literature. Around 1980, his surviving relatives contacted a state publisher, Editura Eminescu, in hopes that they would publish Răzvrătitul Toderiță, which had survived in five different manuscript versions. A superficially fictionalized continuation of a 1937 study, it was at core a biography of the family patriarch. Durnea deplores the one that was finally chosen as a failed experiment, since Rășcanu's attachment to his protagonist had pushed him to omit the book's potential as a fresco of 19th-century life.

In 1988, a Rășcanu interview was republished in Aurel Sasu and Mariana Vartic's anthology of interviews with old-regime novelists. As columnist Ion Vlad observed at the time, the piece revealed nothing about his writing process, and had originally been "pure publicity" for the interviewee; Vlad asked the anthologists to consider whether its inclusion had been at all necessary. The Răzvrătitul Toderiță project stalled and was shelved, without ever being revived before the Romanian Revolution of 1989 did away with communism. The events saw however a revival of interest: writing in 1992, Rădulescu reintroduced Rășcanu as one of the interwar figures who "while never at the forefront of literary activity, have still managed to attain, in some of their works, the level of high artistic accomplishments." He also signaled an entire corpus of memoirs, kept in the family archives and never published. They evidence "a special talent for narration, blending fine irony and self-deprecation, the rawness of confession with a delicacy of sentiment." Rășcanu's nephew Dan managed to publish Răzvrătitul Toderiță at Mühlheim am Main, in Germany, during 2009. Soon after, the full text of Pui de cuc saw print, in the same town. Durnea notes similarities with Aceea care trebuia iubită, in its treatment of romantic love and revolution; the added element is paternal love, expressed toward the "cuckoo" in ways that are increasingly pathological, showing Rășcanu's familiarity with psychoanalysis.
