= Răducanu =

Răducanu is a Romanian surname and occasional given name:

- Claudiu Răducanu (born 1976), Romanian football player
- Cristian Raducanu (born 1967), Romanian and English rugby union player
- Dumitru Răducanu (born 1967), Romanian cox
- Emanoil Răducanu (1929–1991), Romanian basketball player
- Emma Raducanu (born 2002), British tennis player
- Johnny Răducanu (1931–2011), Romanian jazz pianist of Romani descent
- Marcel Răducanu (born 1954), Romanian football player
- Maria Răducanu (born 1967), Romanian jazz songwriter and singer
- Răducanu Necula (born 1946), Romanian football player

== See also ==
- Răducan (surname)
- Radu (given name)
- Radu (surname)
- Rădulescu (surname)
- Rădeni (disambiguation)
- Rădești (disambiguation)
- Răduțești (disambiguation)
- Rădulești (disambiguation)
