= Cotești =

- Commune
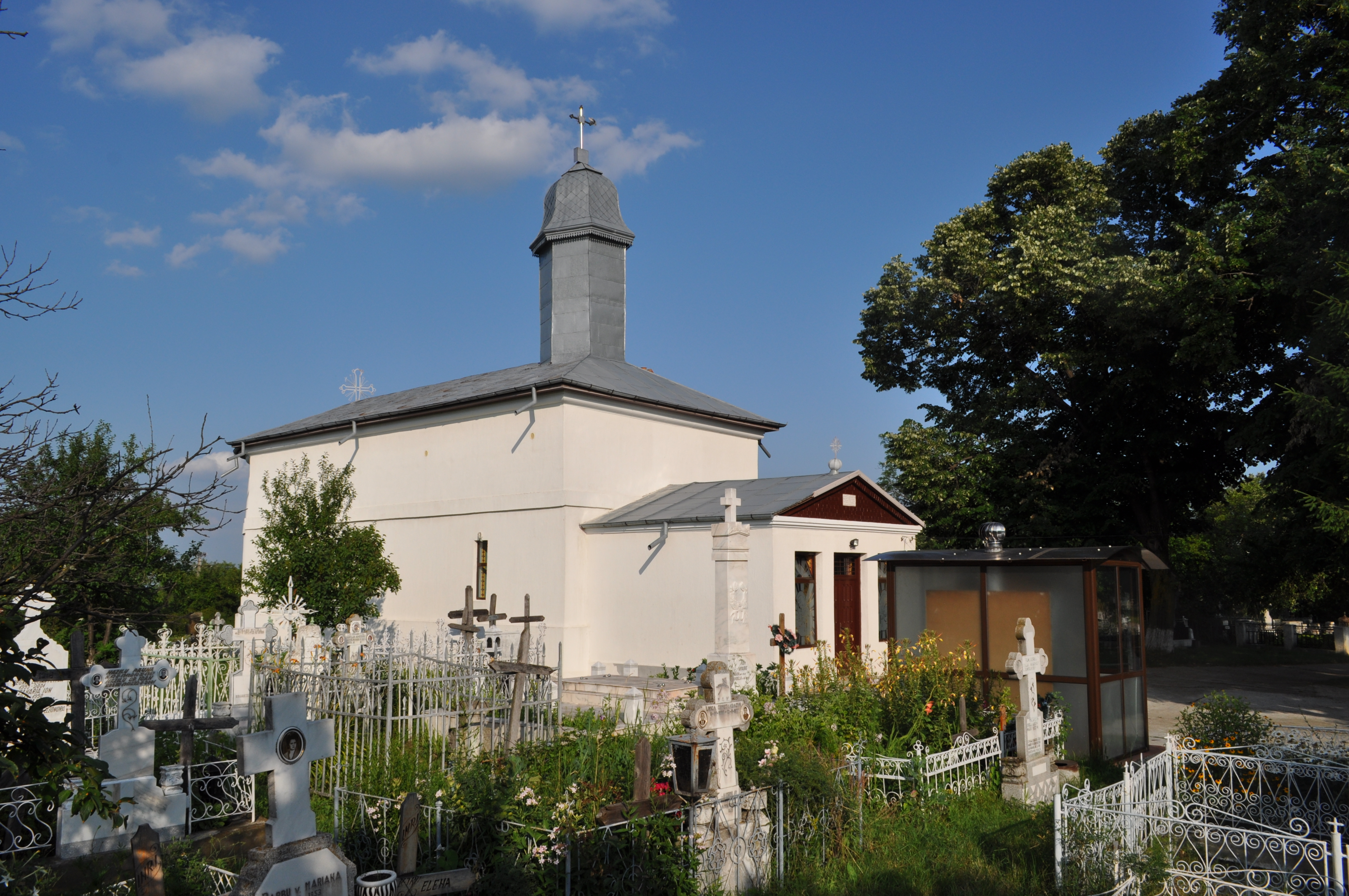
- Church in Cotești

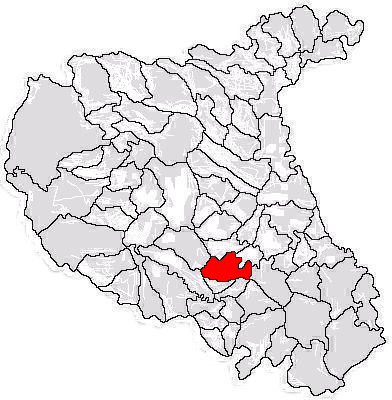
- Location in Vrancea County

- Location in Romania
- Coordinates: 45°39′N 27°03′E
- Country: Romania
- County: Vrancea

Government
  - Mayor (2024–2028): Ionel Croitoru (ADU)
- Area: 41.32 km^{2} (15.95 sq mi)
- Elevation: 200 m (660 ft)
- Population (2021-12-01): 4,772
  - Density: 115.5/km^{2} (299.1/sq mi)
- Time zone: UTC+02:00 (EET)
  - Summer (DST): UTC+03:00 (EEST)
- Postal code: 627100
- Area code: +(40) 237
- Vehicle reg.: VN
- Website: www.primariacotesti.ro

Cotești is a commune located in Vrancea County, Muntenia, Romania. It is composed of four villages: Budești, Cotești, Goleștii de Sus, and Valea Cotești.

Historical population
Year	Pop.	±%
2002	4,778	—
2011	4,641	−2.9%
2021	4,772	+2.8%
Source: Census data

== Natives ==
- G. M. Vlădescu (1885 – 1952), prose writer
- Nicolae Al. Rădulescu (1905 – 1989), geographer, member of the Romanian Academy
