= Antoine Marguier =

Antoine Marguier is a Swiss-French orchestra conductor and pedagogue.

== Biography ==
Antoine Marguier was born in 1969 in Switzerland and started his career as solo clarinet under the direction of Claudio Abbado in the European Union Youth Orchestra and Gustav Mahler Jugendorchester.

== Orchestras ==
Marguier has led such orchestras as the Orchestre de la Suisse Romande, Orchestre philharmonique de Strasbourg, the Swiss Musical Youth Orchestra and the Lausanne Chamber Orchestra, among others. His most recent invitations have included subscription concerts with the Orchestre Symphonique et Lyrique de Nancy, where he led performances of Bruckner's Sixth Symphony, and with the Orchestre National de Lyon. Other recent appearances have included concerts with the Nizaa Symphony Orchestra in Tokyo, the KZN Philharmonic Orchestra in Durban, and the Lausanne Sinfonietta on its 2007 China tour. In August 2009, Marguier returned to China, this time conducting the orchestra of Geneva's Haute Ecole de Musique, during an official visit of the country. In September 2009, he conducted Amsterdam's AskolSchönberg Ensemble in Belgium, France and the Netherlands, in an operatic premiere produced by the Théâtre de la Monnaie.

Marguier served as artistic and music director of the Orchestre à Cordes du Pays de Gex from 1996 to 2005. He has occupied the same positions with the Orchestre Saint-Pierre-Fusterie in Geneva since 1998 and the Geneva Conservatoire Orchestra since 2007. He is also founder and music director of the Orchestre des Nations in Geneva, which made its debut in 2019.

== Guest conductor ==
Since his critical success conducting Stravinsky's Histoire du soldat (as staged by Omar Porras in 2003 and 2004), he has been a regular guest conductor with Geneva's leading contemporary group, the Ensemble Contrechamps, including a tribute to composer Gyorgi Ligeti at the Cully Jazz Festival in collaboration with the pianist Malcolm Braff. Over the last years, he conducted the Orchestre de l'Opéra de Marseille as part of its "Forbidden Music" Festival, honoring composers who were victims of the Nazi regime during the Second World War. In June 2006, Marguier opened the Geneva Summer Music Festival in a concert by the Orchestre de chambre de Genève (Geneva Chamber Orchestra) and, in September 2006, he was guest conductor of the Ensemble Paul Klee in Bern.

Antoine Marguier is Professor of chamber music at the Haute École de Musique and Music Director of the university's Orchestre du Conservatoire. Under his baton, he premiered two operas for younger audiences composed by Robert Clerc: Un Opéra dans le potager and À l'Ombre du grand arbre. Marguier is also music director and co-founder, with comedian Joan Mompart, of the Compagnie du Rossignol, which brings together principal players from the Orchestre de la Suisse Romande with actors in educational concerts and tours.

== Early career ==
A semi-finalist in the Besançon International Conducting Competition in 2001, Antoine Marguier studied orchestral conducting with James Levine, Kurt Masur (Verbier Music Festival), David Zinman (Aspen Music Festival, USA) and Roberto Benzi. Marguier served as assistant conductor to Jesús López-Cobos with the French Youth Orchestra for two seasons.

Antoine Marguier performed as an orchestral instrumentalist for two decades at the highest international level. From this position, he had the benefit of observing and working with many of the greatest living conductors, such as Claudio Abbado at the Gustav Mahler Jugend Orchester. At the age of 22, he was selected by Armin Jordan to become a permanent member of Orchestre de la Suisse Romande. In December 2006, Marguier was the appropriate choice to lead that orchestra in the opening of a memorial concert to his mentor Jordan at Geneva's Grand Théâtre.

After having seen Antoine Marguier conduct a Bruckner symphony, Marek Janowski was unequivocal in his support and encouragement and urged Marguier to leave his position with Orchestre de la Suisse Romande, in order to be able to fully devote himself to his conducting career. Antoine Marguier left the orchestra in June 2009, following 10 years of balancing his dual careers as instrumentalist and conductor.
