= Pilar Mateos =

Spanish writer of children's literature (born 1942)

Pilar Mateos Martín (born 13 August 1942 in Valladolid) is a Spanish writer of children's literature.

In her tales, she uses a simple vocabulary to talk about isolated, marginal or sad characters. She mixes reality and imagination in works where fantasy and dreams can create new realities.

== Bibliography ==
- Jeruso quiere ser gente, 1980
- Historias de Ninguno, 1981
- Capitanes de plástico, 1982
- Molinete, 1984
- La bruja Mon, 1984
- Lucas y Lucas. El rapto de Caballo Gris, 1984
- La isla menguante, 1987
- Mi tío Teo, 1987
- Quisicosas, 1988
- El pequeño Davirón, 1991
- ¡Qué desastre de niño!, 1992
- La casa imaginaria, 1993
- Silveiro el grande, 1993
- Sin miedo a los brujos, 1995
- El reloj de las buenas horas, 1996
- La bruja del pan "pringao", 1997
- Gata García, 1997
- Barbas Jonás y los títeres acatarrados, 1997
- El viejo que no salía en los cuentos, 1997
- El fantasma en calcetines, 1999
- Los chicos de al lado, 2005

== Awards ==
- Jeruso quiere ser gente, 1980, premio El Barco de Vapor
- Historias de Ninguno, 1981, premio El barco de vapor
- Capitanes de plástico, 1982, premio Lazarillo
- Gata García, 1997, premio Edebé
- El fantasma en calcetines, 1999, premio Ala Delta
- 2009, Cervantes Chico Prize
