= Ymarxa =

2011 orchestral piece by Gustavo Díaz-Jerez

Ymarxa is an orchestral piece of classical music by the Spanish composer and pianist Gustavo Díaz-Jerez. Ymarxa is a guanche word meaning 'new', 'brilliant', 'splendid'. It also referred to a place in Tenerife in what today is La Esperanza forest. Together with Ayssuragan, Aranfaybo, Chigaday, Azaenegue, Erbane and Guanapay, Ymarxa is part of a cycle of seven orchestral works inspired in different places of each of the Canary Islands. Ymarxa was commissioned by the XXVII Festival de Música de Canarias and given its first performance on February 12, 2011, at the Alfredo Kraus Auditorium in Gran Canaria by the Royal Philharmonic Orchestra under maestro Charles Dutoit. It was well received by audiences and critics alike. Ymarxa is a one-movement work lasting about 20 minutes, merging elements from spectralism and algorithmic procedures.
