= La casa imaginaria (opera) =

Opera by Gustavo Díaz-Jerez

- Composer: Gustavo Díaz-Jerez
- Librettist: Pilar Mateos
- Language: Spanish
- Based on: La casa imaginaria by Pilar Mateos
- Premiere: November 9, 2018 Auditorio de León (Spain)

La casa imaginaria is a Spanish-language opera by Gustavo Díaz-Jerez to a libretto by Pilar Mateos based on the 1994 short story by the same author. It premiered at the Auditorio de León (Spain) on November 9, 2018, and was sold out for its two performances. The music uses musical material drawn from algorithmic procedures, as well as Iamus computer bio-inspired approach to music composition.
