= Ioan Hristea =

Ioan Hristea (17 March 1897 – 1 March 1974) was a Romanian officer during World War II.

He was born in 1897 in Chițcani, at the time in Tutova County, now in Vaslui County. He attended military school from 1914 to 1916, graduating with the rank of second lieutenant. After the Kingdom of Romania entered World War I on the side of the Allies in August 1916, Hristea fought in the passes of the Carpathian Mountains and was wounded at the First Battle of Oituz. On November 28, 1916, he fought at the Battle of Prunaru, where he was the only Romanian officer who survived the engagement with the German forces. In 1917 he advanced in rank to lieutenant and fought with the 2nd Roșiori Regiment in Moldavia. He then participated with his regiment in the Romanian military intervention in Bessarabia and in 1919 he fought in the Hungarian–Romanian War. In 1920 he was promoted to captain.

On June 22, 1941, Romania joined Operation Barbarossa on the side of the Axis, in order to reclaim the lost territories of Bessarabia and Northern Bukovina, which had been annexed by the Soviet Union in June 1940. Hristea fought at the battle to retake Khotyn; for his actions during this battle, he was decorated in October 1941 with the Order of Michael the Brave, 3rd Class. In 1942 he was promoted to colonel and took command of the 2nd Călărași Regiment. At the Battle of Stalingrad, his regiment defended an 80 km (50 mi) gap in the frontline, permitting the retreat of the Romanian 4th Army. Gravely wounded by fire from a Soviet tank, Hristea was evacuated on a cart, almost frozen to death. For his actions at Stalingrad, he was awarded in March 1943 the Knight's Cross of the Iron Cross.

Hristea retired from the Army in 1946 and was put in the reserves in 1947. He was promoted to brigadier general (reserves), and later advanced to lieutenant general (reserves). He died in 1974 in Sibiu.

== Awards ==
- Iron Cross (1939) 2nd and 1st Class
- Order of Michael the Brave (17 October 1941) 3rd Class
- Knight's Cross of the Iron Cross (28 March 1943)
