= Metaludios (piano) =

Collection of piano pieces by Gustavo Díaz-Jerez

Metaludios is a collection of piano pieces written by Spanish composer and pianist Gustavo Díaz-Jerez.

== History ==
The composition of the Metaludios started in 2013 following a commission from Spanish pianist Marta Zabaleta. As of 2021, a total of thirty Metaludios have been published, grouped in books of six pieces, totalling five books. The word Metaludio is derived from the prefix meta-, “beyond” and the suffix -ludio, from the Latin ludēre, “to play”, or “to exercise”.

== Style ==
The Metaludios belong to the contemporary classical music genre. Like other works by the composer, they use scientific models from which musical material is derived. These include fractal images, cellular automata, L-Systems, numerical sequences, Artificial Intelligence, etc. Other sources of inspiration include literature and mythology. Some Metaludios are written as hommages to concrete artists (Antonio Soler, Brahms, Antonio José, Gesualdo, Martín Chirino, etc.). Many employ extended techniques and electronics. Psychoacoustics and the search for new sonorities to extend the expressive palette of the piano is central to the composition of these pieces.

== Recordings ==
Books I-V of Metaludios have been recorded on CD for Spanish record label IBS Classical, featuring the composer at the piano. A first CD, containing Books I-III appeared in 2018. A second CD, containing Books IV and V, was published in 2021.

== Reception ==
The Metaludios have received excellent reviews both in Spain and abroad. British music critic David McDade compares the Metaludios with the Ligeti études, suggesting they could be their successors:

An obvious point of comparison, it seems to me, are the Ligeti Etudes which, in recent years, have been getting the recognition they deserve as some of the most innovative piano works of the end of the 20th and beginning of the 21st centuries. Only time will tell if Díaz-Jerez’ games will prove to be their successors but right now I have to say that I believe they will.

— David McDade, "Gustavo DÍAZ-JEREZ (b.1970). Metaludios II: Books 4 & 5", MusicWeb International (24/11/2021)

Spanish composer and music critic Tomás Marco wrote:

An example of what a great composer can do with a great pianist and that in this case they are the same person. For those who are scared when music and science are integrated, this is a good example of imagination, attractiveness and also beauty. Very innovative, but splendid.

— Tomás Marco, "Los Metaludios de Gustavo Díaz-Jerez", Revista Scherzo (18/09/2021)

Miguel Ángel Pérez Martín, in his review titled The piano of the future? for Docenotas music magazine, writes:

Highly recommended. A different listening experience every time. A great musical discovery...

— Miguel Ángel Pérez Martín, "Los Metaludios de Gustavo Díaz-Jerez", Revista Docenotas (18/09/2021)

== Table of pieces ==
	Title	Approximate duration	Extended techniques	Electronics
Book I	Izar iluna	4'	No	No
Book I	Kenotaphion	1'45	No	No
Book I	Imaginary continuum	2'30	No	No
Book I	Homenaje a Antonio Soler	5'	No	No
Book I	Orahan	5'	No	No
Book I	Stheno	6'45	Yes	No
Book II	Quantum foam	3'	Yes	No
Book II	Succubus	4'30	Yes	No
Book II	Rule 110	2'30	No	No
Book II	Hommage à Horațiu Rădulescu	2'30	No	No
Book II	Étude pour les unissons	3'	Yes	No
Book II	Sisyphus	5'	No	No
Book III	Prélude non mesuré	2'30	No	Yes
Book III	An error occurred	1'30	No	No
Book III	Eine Hommage an J. Brahms	4'	No	No
Book III	Microsuite	5'	Yes	No
Book III	Modular form	2'	No	Yes
Book III	Nonlinear recurrences	4'30	Yes	Yes
Book IV	Eigengrau	4'	Yes	No
Book IV	L-System	5'	No	No
Book IV	Mice music	3'	Yes	No
Book IV	Stribog	4'30	No	No
Book IV	Omaggio a Carlo Gesualdo	4'	Yes	No
Book IV	La espiral del viento	10'	Yes	Yes
Book V	Melussyne	11'	Yes	Yes
Book V	Boötes void	6'	Yes	No
Book V	Cassini's dream	5'45	Yes	Yes
Book V	Pavana triste (Homenaje a Antonio José)	4'	No	No
Book V	Hidden states	4'	No	No
Book V	Belphegor's prime	8'45	Yes	No
