= Moneiba =

Guanche goddesses

Moneiba was the protector and tutelary goddess of women on the island of Hierro in the Canary Islands. The god Eranoranhan played the same part for men. She formed part of the mythology of the Bimbache, the aboriginal inhabitants of Hierro, who were related to the Guanches on other nearby islands and distantly to the Berber people of North Africa. The god lived on one rock, the goddess on another. They would descend to hear the prayers of the people.
