= Gustavo Díaz-Jerez =

Spanish pianist and composer (born 1970)

- Born: 27 February 1970 (age 56); Tenerife
- Education: Manhattan School of Music
- Occupations: Classical composer, pianist, academic teacher

Gustavo Díaz-Jerez (born 27 February 1970) is a Spanish pianist and composer.

== Biography ==
Gustavo Díaz-Jerez was born on 27 February 1970 in Tenerife. Díaz-Jerez studied piano with J. A. Rodriguez at the Conservatorio Superior of Santa Cruz de Tenerife, and subsequently with Solomon Mikowsky at Manhattan School of Music in New York City. He has performed extensively throughout Europe, Asia, South America, the UK and the US. He has collaborated with conductors such as Ivan Fischer, Victor Pablo, Gunther Herbig, Adrian Leaper, José R. Encinar, etc., with orchestras such as the Budapest Festival Orchestra, as well as the major Spanish orchestras (Tenerife, Gran Canaria, Galicia, Nacional de Cataluña, Castilla y León, Sinfónica de Madrid). He has been invited to play at various international music festivals, including the Festival Internacional de Canarias, Festival de La Roque-d'Anthéron, Quincena Musical Donostiarra, Festival Internacional de Santander, among others.

He studied composition with Giampaolo Bracali and Ludmila Ulehla at Manhattan School of Music. His compositional language may be defined as “algorithmic spectralism”, merging elements of the spectralist movement (Grisey, Murail, Radulescu, etc.), in which timbre plays a fundamental role, with processes derived from mathematical disciplines such as cellular automata, L-systems, fractals, genetic algorithms, number theory, spectrum analysis, additive synthesis, psychoacoustics, etc. Needless to say, the use of the computer is indispensable, usually producing results in the form of electronic music. However, his main interest is not in electroacoustics, but to “transcribe” these results using traditional instruments. This requires a very careful and elaborate process of quantization of melodic, rhythmic and timbre elements, so it can be adequately performed by human players. These transformations, however, leave intact the essence of the original process. His works are currently published by Composers Edition. A programmer as well, he has written the PC freeware program FractMus, which explores fractal and generative processes for music composition. His articles on the subject have been published by specialized magazines such as Electronic Musician. and MIT's Leonardo Music Journal.

Since 2002, he is a professor of piano at the Centro Superior de Música del País Vasco. He is also a member of the Real Academia Canaria de Bellas Artes.

An enthusiast of virtual reality, he created the first YouTube channel for classical music exclusively in VR.

== Compositions ==
Orchestral

- Ricercare: D. Schostakovitch in Memoriam for viola d'amore and string orchestra
- Ymarxa for orchestra
- Aranfaybo for chamber orchestra
- Havan, concertino for viola d'amore and chamber orchestra
- Ayssuragan, symphonic poem for clarinet and orchestra
- Tajogaite, concerto for piano and orchestra
- Spectra fractalis for orchestra

Chamber music

- Trio for violin, cello and piano
- Sidhe, for violin, viola, cello and piano four-hands
- Sonata for violin and piano
- Sonata for viola and piano (2003)
- Partita for viola d'amore, piano, vibraphone, marimba and multi percussion
- Ricercare: D. Schostakovitch in Memoriam for viola d'amore and piano
- Dhyana for viola d'amore and piano
- Akhkhazu for alto saxophone and piano
- Plerion for trumpet and piano
- Tiamat for violin, viola, cello, double bass, and piano
- Three Pieces for clarinet and piano
- Tephra for violin, viola, cello, and piano
- Olokun for marimba duo

Solo instrumental

- Gehenna for piano solo
- Phase Space for viola d'amore
- Nous for solo flute
- Metaludios, Book I
- Metaludios, Book II
- Metaludios, Book III
- Metaludios, Book IV
- Metaludios, Book V

Vocal

- Zenith, for violin, viola, cello, flute, harp and voice
- Songs of Garajonay, for voice and piano
- Nudo de luz, for voice sextet

Opera

- La casa imaginaria

== Personal life ==
He married Belinda Sánchez Mozo and their son is Pablo Díaz Sánchez.
