= Bimbache =

Ethnic group of the Canary Islands

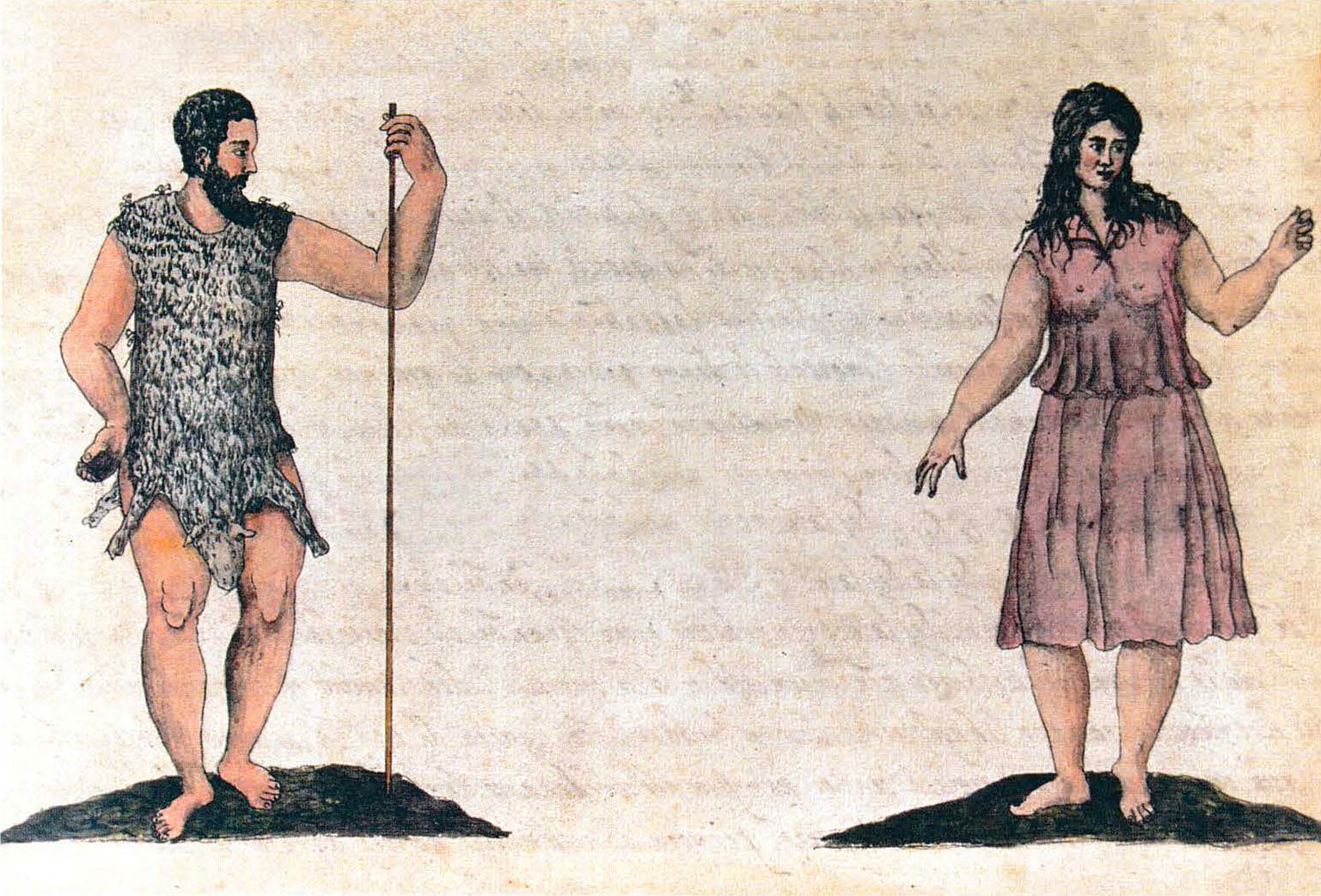
- Painting of Bimbache by Leonardo Torriani, 1592

Total population
- Unknown

Regions with significant populations

Religion
- Animism

Related ethnic groups
- Berber · Riffian · Guanches

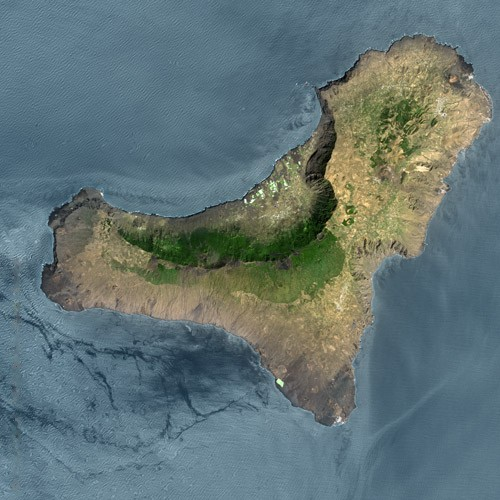
Satellite image of the island of El Hierro

The Bimbache or Bimbape were inhabitants of El Hierro prior to the Spanish conquest of the Canary Islands that took place between 1402 and 1496. The Bimbache are one of several peoples native to the Canaries, with a genetic and cultural link to the Berber people of North Africa. They shared a common link with other aboriginal peoples of the island group.

The island of El Hierro was known to the Bimbache as Eseró or Heró. The word Bimbache means "sons of the sons of Tenerife", and they were believed to be descendants of the Guanches, the ancient inhabitants of the island of Tenerife.

== Spanish conquest and the Bimbache ==
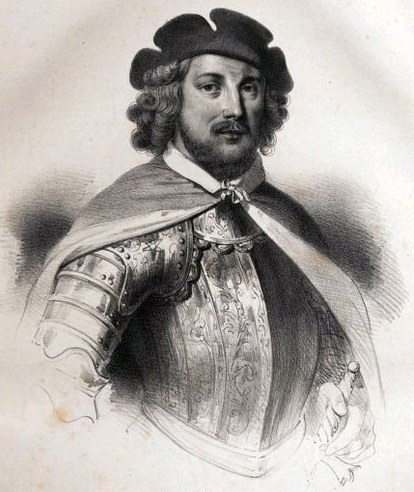
Jean de Béthencourt

The Spanish conquest of the Canary Islands was carried out in late 1405 by the French explorer Jean de Béthencourt, who promised to respect the freedom of the Bimbache, and he faced no resistance from the small aboriginal population. This promise was broken by de Béthencourt's son, who sold most of the Bimbache inhabitants as slaves, and the island was repopulated with Spanish and Norman settlers.

Before the arrival of the Castilian and Aragonese crown forces, the population was largely pastoral, raising cattle, goats, sheep, and pigs, alongside the cultivation of grain and marine resources. As there were no merchant trade routes servicing the island, the vessels that brought the inhabitants there were destroyed with time and left a domestic market whose trading system was based on the exchange of local produce. Land and other common resources were managed and distributed equally by collective agreements held during meetings chaired by a mediating king, using a system of participatory democracy where the king was a figure of justice and democratic compromise.

== Bimbache mythology ==
Each island of the Canaries had its own gods, though they all shared common concepts in their mythology, such as divine power represented by nature. The two benign deities in El Hierro were the god Eraorahan and the goddess Moneiba, with a third malevolent god, Aranfaybo, who was prayed to in times of desperation.

The gradual expansion of control by the crowns of Castile and Aragon delegated benefits of both land and commercial production rights to a minority by means of a feudal regime. Additionally, the native religion's symbols of nature were suppressed in order to introduce Christianity to the islands. Both before and after the incorporation of El Hierro to the Spanish crown, some population of working age were taken from the island to Castile for slave labour, before ultimately being returned to the island. Later, the island was populated by people of French and Galician origin, also under a feudal system by the crowns of Castile and Aragon.

== Genetics ==
Ordóñez et al. 2017 examined the remains of a large number of Bimbache buried at Punta Azul, El Hierro, c. 1015–1200 AD. The 16 samples of Y-DNA extracted belonged to the paternal haplogroups E1a (1 sample), E1b1b1a1 (7 samples), and R1b1a2 (7 samples). All the extracted samples of mtDNA belonged to the maternal haplogroup H1-1626. E1a is most common in sub-Saharan Africa, while E1b1b1a1 is very common in North Africa. R1b1a2 is considered a typical European lineage but is also found at low frequencies in North Africa. About 10% of examined Guanches of Gran Canaria have been found to be carriers of R1b1a2. The dominance of a single maternal lineage (H1-1626) suggests that the Bimbache were a matrilineal society. The authors of the study suggested that the Bimbache were descended from the earliest of two or more migration waves from North Africa to the Canary Islands.

== Sources ==
- Ordóñez, Alejandra C.; et al. (February 2017). "Genetic studies on the prehispanic population buried in Punta Azul cave (El Hierro, Canary Islands)". Journal of Archaeological Science. 78. Elsevier: 20–28. Bibcode:2017JArSc..78...20O. doi:10.1016/j.jas.2016.11.004.
