= Spectra fractalis =

Orchestral piece of classical music

Spectra fractalis is an orchestral piece of classical music by the Spanish composer and pianist Gustavo Díaz-Jerez. Spectra fractalis was awarded unanimously the first prize at the 2018 Martín Chirino composition competition held by the Fundación de Arte y pensamiento Martín Chirino. Spectra fractalis is a one-movement work lasting about 7 minutes, merging elements from spectralism and algorithmic procedures. It is inspired by Martín Chirino's iron sculpture Herramienta poética e inútil (right). The jury praised the work's "...high level of creation, which employs modern techniques in a poetic way, and which adapts to the space and the sculpture". It was premiered on September 21, 2018 at the Auditorio Alfredo Kraus by the Orquesta Filarmónica de Gran Canaria under the baton of its chief conductor Karel Mark Chichon on its premiere season concert. It was very well received by audience and critics alike.
