= Adrian Radu Gontariu =

Romanian volleyball player (born 1984)

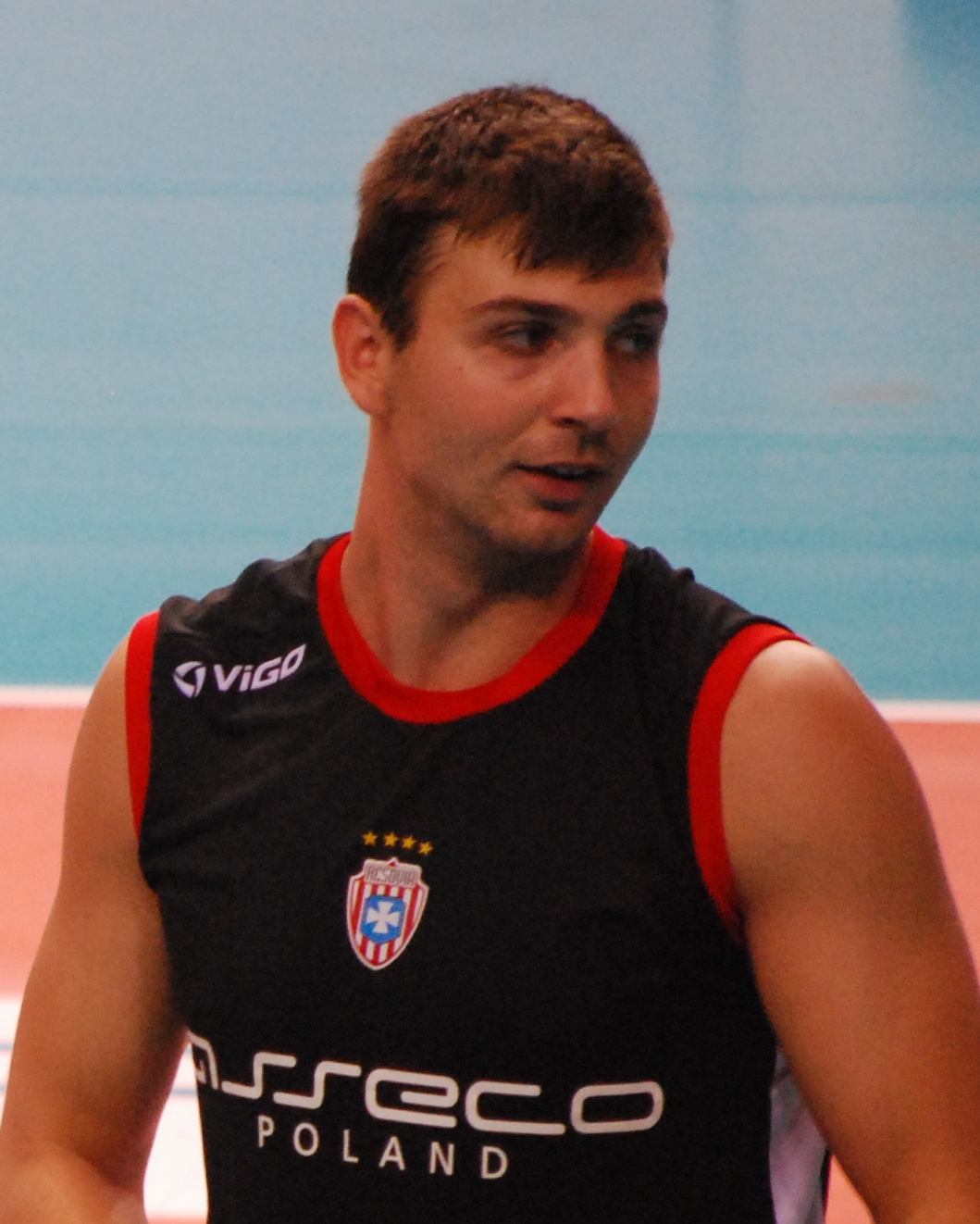

Personal information
- Full name: Adrian Radu Gontariu
- Nationality: Romanian
- Born: 14 May 1984 (age 42); Zalău, Romania
- Height: 2.05 m (6 ft 9 in)
- Weight: 100 kg (220 lb)
- Spike: 355 cm (140 in)
- Block: 335 cm (132 in)

Volleyball information
- Position: Opposite
- Current club: Remat Zalău
- Number: 14

Career
Years	Teams
2000–2005; 2005–2007; 2007–2008; 2008–2009; 2009–2011; 2011–2012; 2012–2012; 2013–2013; 2013–2014; 2014–2016; 2016–	Deltacons Tulcea; Tomis Constanța; Baniyas Abu Dhabi; Remat Zalău; VfB Friedrichshafen; Asseco Resovia Rzeszów; Rennes Volley 35; Tomis Constanța; AZS Politechnika Warszawska; VfB Friedrichshafen; Remat Zalău

National team
2002–	Romania
- Last updated: 19 February 2017

Adrian Radu Gontariu (born 14 May 1984) is a Romanian volleyball player, a member of Romania men's national volleyball team and Romanian club Remat Zalău, four-time Romanian Champion (2003, 2004, 2005, 2007), three-time German Champion (2010, 2011, 2015), Polish Champion (2012).

== Career ==
=== Clubs ===
In 2014 he joined to German club VfB Friedrichshafen. On 1 March 2015 he won German Cup with VfB Friedrichshafen.

== Sporting achievements ==
=== Clubs ===
==== CEV Cup ====
- 2011/2012 - with Asseco Resovia Rzeszów

==== National championships ====
- 2002/2003 Romanian Cup, with Deltacons Tulcea
- 2002/2003 Romanian Championship, with Deltacons Tulcea
- 2003/2004 Romanian Championship, with Deltacons Tulcea
- 2004/2005 Romanian Championship, with Deltacons Tulcea
- 2005/2006 Romanian Cup, with Tomis Constanța
- 2005/2006 Romanian Championship, with Tomis Constanța
- 2006/2007 Romanian Cup, with Tomis Constanța
- 2006/2007 Romanian Championship, with Tomis Constanța
- 2009/2010 German Championship, with VfB Friedrichshafen
- 2010/2011 German Championship, with VfB Friedrichshafen
- 2011/2012 Polish Championship, with Asseco Resovia Rzeszów
- 2014/2015 German Cup, with VfB Friedrichshafen
- 2014/2015 German Championship, with VfB Friedrichshafen
