= Orchestre de chambre de Genève =

Swiss orchestra from Geneva

The Geneva Chamber Orchestra (L'OCG, L'Orchestre de chambre de Genève), is a Swiss professional orchestra based in Geneva. It was founded in 1958.
