= Radu Vodă (disambiguation) =

Radu Vodă may refer to:

- Negru Vodă, a name for a legendary Wallachian voivode.
- Radu Vodă, a village in Lupșanu Commune, Călăraşi County
- Radu Vodă, a village in Izvoarele Commune, Giurgiu County
- Radu Vodă Monastery in Bucharest, Romania
