= Cristo Barrios =

- Origin: Tenerife, Spain
- Genres: Classical music
- Occupations: Soloist and chamber musician
- Website: cristo-barrios.com

Cristo Barrios (born 30 May 1976 in Tenerife, Spain) is a Spanish clarinetist, soloist and chamber musician.

== Biography ==
Cristo Barrios is a Spanish clarinetist, born in Tenerife, Spain in 1976. Future highlights include performances at the Amsterdam Concertgebouw and Spanish National Auditorium, his debut performance at the Konzerthaus Berlin, a recital at the Konzerthaus Wien, a recording for the Spanish National Radio (RNE2) and his debut performance at the South Bank Centre (Purcell Room) in London. Recent engagements have included performances with the Endellion and Arditti String Quartets, after his debut performance at the Wigmore Hall, his tour with the Brodsky Quartet and a debut recital at the Carnegie Hall. He has also performed at festivals such as Torroella de Montgrí and Sant Pere de Rodes in Spain, Langvad Music Days in Denmark and Llangollen International Music Festival in Wells (with a special broadcast for the S4Channel), among others.

== Soloist and chamber musician ==
Barrios is a musician with a keen interest in contemporary music. His enthusiasm in this has resulted in the premières of Cantus Firmus (Wigmore Hall) and Clarinet Quintet (with the Arditti String Quartet) by Blai Soler. His ambition to explore new music has also led him to collaborate with important composers such as Joseph Horovitz, Tom Johnson (before touring his Tilework Series for solo clarinet in The Netherland, Poland, Czech Republic and France), and Esa-Pekka Salonen (before recording his Nachtlieder for Metier Records, a CD which also includes works for clarinet and piano by Bernstein, Bax – Radio New Zealand broadcast -, Berg, Brotons and Honegger). His last CD, Composers of the 21st century in the Canary Islands, was recently released by RALS.

== Awards ==
Major prizes include first prize and the gold medal at the Primer Palau Competition, playing the Rossini Introduction, Theme and Variations in the Palau de la Música Hall, Barcelona, and the first prize at the CHAIN Concours Moderne in Riga. While studying at the Royal Academy of Music in London, he went on to win the Yamaha Music Foundation of Europe Scholarship, held at St John's Smith Square and broadcast by the BBC3. After finishing his degree at the Royal Academy he recorded 'The Voice of the Clarinet' (Divine Art Records), an innovative disc of songs transcribed for clarinet and piano.

== Discography ==
- 2006: The voice of the clarinet, with transcriptions of lied, Divine Art Records.
- 2007: Chamber music for orchestra, chamber music by Joaquim Homs, Naxos.
- 2008: Contemporary music for clarinet, Metier Records.
- 2008: Nuevas composiciones para clarinete, RALS.
