= Domnica Radulescu =

Romanian-born American writer

Domnica Rădulescu is a Romanian-born American writer of novels, plays and books of literary criticism. She is the author of three novels: Train to Trieste (2008), Black Sea Twilight (2010) and Country of Red Azaleas (2016). She has also authored books and edited collections on theater, Eastern European literature, exile literature, representations of women and humor.

Two of her plays, The Town with Very Nice People (2013) and Exile Is My Home (2014) were finalists for the Jane Chambers Playwriting Award, Exile Is My Home was presented as a staged reading at TheaterLab off Broadway and was staged as a full production at the Theater for the New City in April 2016. She is a Fulbright scholar and the founding director of the National Symposium of Theater in Academe.

== Style ==
Rădulescu's novels feature women protagonists and have themes including female interpersonal relationships, striving for freedom, being nomadic and changing perspective with travel, and repairing problems or personal traumas.

Two novels, Train to Trieste and Black Sea Twilight, take place during the dictatorship of Nicolae Ceaușescu and describe daily life experiences and culture in Romania as part of the Eastern Bloc.

== Awards ==
Exile Is My Home won the Hispanic Organization of Latin Actors's 2016 HOLA Award for performance by an ensemble cast.

== Works ==
=== Fiction ===
- Country of Red Azaleas, 2016.
- Black Sea Twilight, 2010
- Train to Trieste 2008

=== Plays ===
- Exile is my Home : Four plays by Domnica Radulescu, 2014
- Dos obras dramáticas, 2016
- Madame Monde/Madam World: One-Act and Short Plays, 2023

=== Memoir ===
- Dream in a Suitcase, 2021

=== Anthology ===
- Voices on the Move, 2020
- Immigrant Voices in the Pandemic

=== Literary Criticism ===
- Theater of War and Exile. Twelve Playwrights, Directors and Performers from Eastern Europe and Israel, 2015
- Women’s Comedic Art as Social Revolution. Five Performers and the Lessons of Their Subversive Humor. McFarland Publishing, 2011
- Realms of Exile. Nomadism, Diasporas and Eastern European Voices, 2002
- Sisters of Medea. The Tragic Heroine across Cultures, 2002

== Further consideration ==
- American Romanian Cultural Society (7 February 2022). "Dream in a Suitcase: The Story of an Immigrant Life by Domnica Rădulescu" (video). YouTube. American Romanian Cultural Society.
- Romanian Cultural Institute New York (13 October 2020). "Mihaela Moscaliuc and Domnica Rădulescu / Romanian Women Voices in North America" (video). youtube.com. Romanian Cultural Institute New York.
