= Marius Mircu =

Marius Mircu (June 9, 1909 – September 2008) was a Romanian journalist and memoirist.

Born into a Jewish family in Bacău, he graduated from the law faculty of the University of Bucharest in 1935. His brothers were mathematician Solomon Marcus and writer Marcel Marcian. From 1935 to 1938, he was editing secretary at Ion Pas' Gazeta; from 1946 to 1949, he held a similar post at George Călinescu's Națiunea. He also worked with N. D. Cocea.

Mircu was active in the Jewish community from 1942 to 1986, first handling documents and then setting up and heading the Museum of Romanian Jewish History, which was founded on the initiative of Chief Rabbi Moses Rosen. In 1987, he emigrated to Israel, where he published his memoirs.
