= Pablo Díaz (game show contestant) =

Spanish violinist and game show contestant (born 1997)

- Born: Pablo Díaz Sánchez; 5 February 1997 (age 28); Santa Cruz de Tenerife, Canary Islands, Spain
- Occupations: Violinist; game show contestant; musical composer; Twitch streamer
- Known for: Winner on Pasapalabra

Pablo Díaz Sánchez (born 5 February 1997) is a Spanish violinist, best known for winning €1,828,000, the progressive jackpot of the Spanish game show Pasapalabra.

== Early life and education ==
Pablo Díaz Sánchez was born on 5 February 1997 in Santa Cruz de Tenerife, Canary Islands, Spain. He is the only son of Gustavo Díaz-Jerez and Belinda Sánchez Mozo, both musicians. Although both are Spaniards, they met in New York City. A year after Díaz was born, they moved to Madrid. He started to play the violin when he was five years old, and the piano when he was six. When he turned 12, he focused only on the violin, and at 16, he started studying at the Reina Sofía School of Music. In 2020, Díaz was studying a Master of Music in violin, at the Conservatorium van Amsterdam, Netherlands.

== Pasapalabra ==
=== Telecinco era ===
When he was 15, Díaz and his grandmother used to watch Pasapalabra, a television game show loosely based on The Alphabet Game, and that at the time was broadcast by Telecinco. She encouraged him to participate and as he became 18, he started to prepare for the programme by watching previous episodes and by studying the dictionary. Díaz joined on 26 January 2017 and after 47 episodes, Díaz was eliminated by Julio Escartín, who was competing during his debut episode. While Escartín won the progressive jackpot of €310,000, Díaz took home his accumulated reward, €49,800. Díaz rejoined Pasapalabra on 7 June 2018 after he replaced a participant that left for personal reasons. Three episodes later, he was eliminated, winning only €1,800.

=== Antena 3 era ===
After Pasapalabra moved to Antena 3, Díaz returned to the programme on 26 June 2020. As of 26 June 2021, Díaz had appeared on 255 episodes, having won 141 of them, drawing 69 duels, and losing 45 times; overall, he participated against 14 others. On the episode broadcast on 1 July 2021, and after 260 consecutive episodes, Díaz won the progressive jackpot of €1,828,000. During the episode, Díaz answered 13 questions during his first round, and during his second round, he gave 12 consecutive answers, with Dux being his last word.

During this run, Díaz achieved several records, including being the participant with the most consecutive episodes (260), the one with the most episodes overall (310), the largest accumulated potential reward in case of being eliminated (€215,400), the one with the more "Silla Azul" games–losing it is the only way a participant can get eliminated–(39, as of 5 May 2021), the longest consecutive duel-streak against another participant (84, shared with Luis de Lama), and winning Pasapalabra's third-largest jackpot ever.

== Personal life ==
Díaz has been dating Marta Wheat, a Spanish musician. They met in the set of Pasapalabra when she competed for a place in the game show.

== Career ==
Díaz has given violin concerts throughout Spain. He received the award for the most outstanding student of the Cátedra de Música de Cámara from the Queen Sofía of Spain and collaborated with the solidarity initiative Música en Vena, which brings music to hospitals.

On 23 February 2021, Díaz announced the creation of a Twitch channel, in which he discusses various topics such as how he studied for Pasapalabra, gives violin concerts for his followers, and does speedruns of Mario Bros video games. On 3 July, two days after winning the jackpot, Díaz broadcast the longest live stream on his Twitch channel, which lasted 17 hours and 35 minutes and ending with one of the promises he made after winning the Pasapalabra jackpot, to dye his hair blue.
