= Radu Negru (disambiguation) =

Radu Negru may refer to:

- Radu Negru, a name for a legendary Wallachian voivode.
- Radu Negru (footballer), Romanian footballer
- Radu Negru, a village in Călineşti Commune, Argeș County, Romania
- Radu Negru, a village in Modelu Commune, Călăraşi County, Romania
- Radu Negru National College, a high school in Făgăraș, Romania
