= Radu Lucian Sulica =

Romanian-born American laryngologist and author

Radu Lucian Sulica is a Romanian-born American laryngologist and author. He currently serves as Professor and Chief, Laryngology and Voice Disorders at the Sean Parker Institute for the Voice at Weill Cornell Medical College in New York City. Sulica has published several books in the field, including Vocal Fold Paralysis, the compendium on this dominant topic in laryngology. He has written a review of a sub-category of vocal fold paralysis, the idiopathic cases.

He is notable among contemporary practitioners of laryngology for his prolific writing and focus on the historical context of laryngology and its problems; for example, his paper "War, politics & the voice: The vocal fold paralysis of George Orwell".

Further contributions include his early adoption and promotion of Gray's mini-thyrotomy, his singular description of laryngeal thrush, and being a major proponent of the significance of vocal fold paresis in voice complaints.

His latest collaboration, with Ryan Branski, PhD of the New York University Voice Center is entitled Classics in Voice and Laryngology.
