= Radu Lazăr =

Romanian water polo player

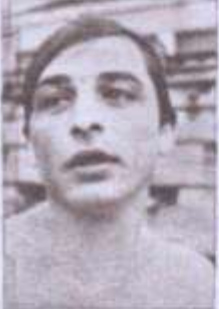

Personal information
- Nationality: Romanian
- Born: 21 December 1947 (age 78) Bucharest, Romania

Sport
- Sport: Water polo

Radu Lazăr (21 December 1947 - December 2024) was a Romanian water polo player. He competed in the men's tournament at the 1972 Summer Olympics.
