= Pablo Díaz (footballer, born 1981) =

Spanish footballer

Personal information
- Full name: Pablo Díaz Vázquez
- Date of birth: 14 December 1981 (age 44)
- Place of birth: Oviedo, Spain
- Height: 1.78 m (5 ft 10 in)
- Position: Midfielder

Youth career
- Oviedo

Senior career*
Years	Team	Apps	(Gls)
1999–2001	Oviedo B	29	(1)
2001–2003	Oviedo	59	(4)
2003–2004	Atlético Madrid B	15	(0)
2004–2005	Rayo Vallecano	18	(4)
2005–2006	Cultural Leonesa	29	(2)
2006–2007	Marino	34	(6)
2007	Lleida	16	(0)
2008–2009	Marino	53	(3)
2009–2010	Caudal	32	(3)
2010–2011	Avilés	34	(2)
2011–2013	Luarca	71	(12)
2013–2014	Langreo	40	(1)
2014–2015	Tuilla	29	(0)
2015–2019	La Madalena de Morcín	37	(11)
- * Club domestic league appearances and goals

Pablo Díaz Vázquez (born 14 December 1981) is a Spanish former footballer who played as midfielder.

== Football career ==
Díaz was born in Oviedo, Asturias. During his career, spent mainly in the lower leagues and in his native region, he represented Real Oviedo, Atlético Madrid B, Rayo Vallecano, Cultural y Deportiva Leonesa, Marino de Luanco (twice), UE Lleida, Caudal Deportivo, Real Avilés, Luarca CF, UP Langreo and CD Tuilla.

In the early 2000s, Díaz played in two Segunda División seasons with Oviedo, being a regular first-team unit and suffering relegation in his second year.

== Honours ==
Atlético Madrid B

- Segunda División B: 2003–04
