= Costești, Vaslui =

Commune in Romania

Costești
- Commune
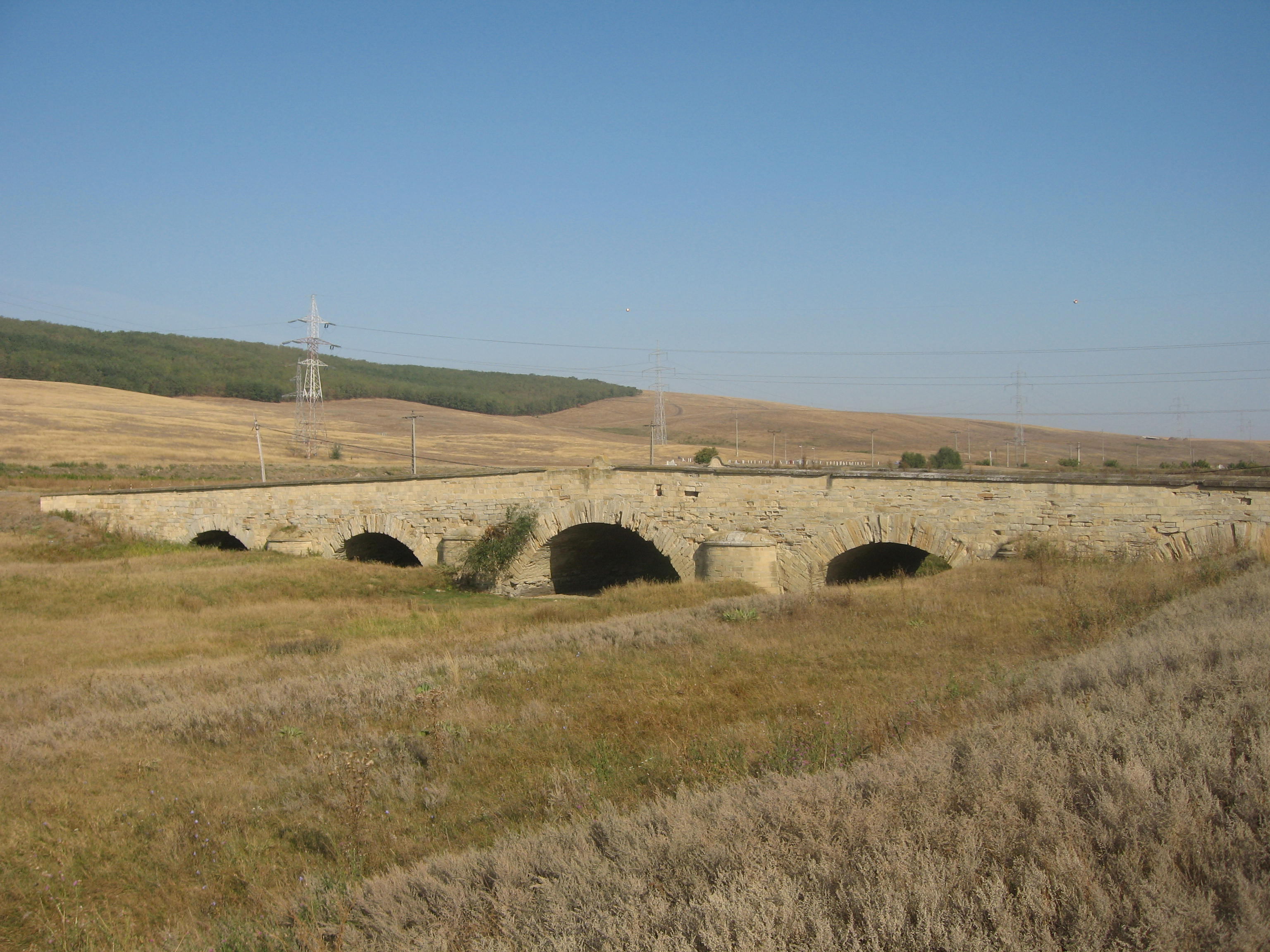
- Docolina Bridge, în Chițcani village

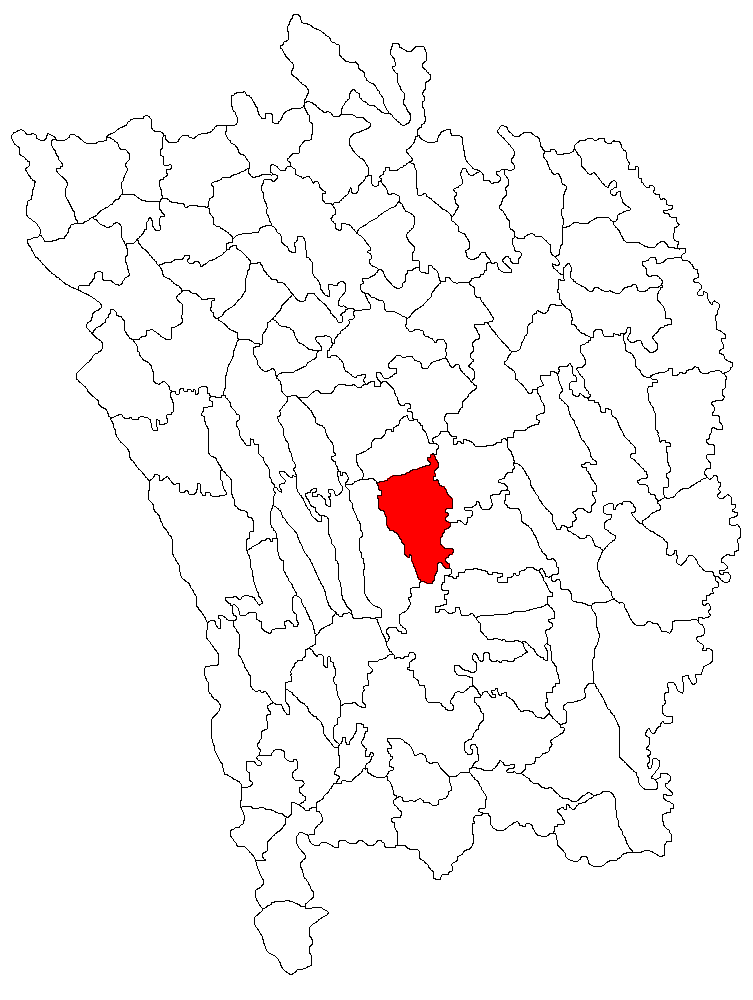
- Location in Vaslui County

- Location in Romania
- Coordinates: 46°30′N 27°45′E
- Country: Romania
- County: Vaslui
- Subdivisions: Chițcani, Costești, Dinga, Pârvești, Puntișeni, Rădești

Government
  - Mayor (2020–2024): Lascăr Popa (PNL)
- Area: 73.6 km^{2} (28.4 sq mi)
- Elevation: 155 m (509 ft)
- Population (2021-12-01): 2,477
  - Density: 33.7/km^{2} (87.2/sq mi)
- Time zone: UTC+02:00 (EET)
  - Summer (DST): UTC+03:00 (EEST)
- Postal code: 737145
- Area code: +40 x37
- Vehicle reg.: VS
- Website: primariacostesti.ro

Costești is a commune in Vaslui County, Western Moldavia, Romania. It is composed of six villages: Chițcani, Costești, Dinga, Pârvești, Puntișeni, and Rădești.It has a total population of 2.867 people.

The commune is located in the central part of the county, 21 km (13 mi) south of the county seat, Vaslui.

On 20 March 2010, Realitatea TV, together with Petrom, MaiMultVerde, Romsilva and the Vaslui County Council, planted 25,000 saplings on an area of 5 ha (12 acres) in Chițcani.

== Natives ==
- Ioan Hristea (1897–1974), officer during World War I and World War II
