= Nicolae G. Rădulescu-Niger =

Nicolae G. Rădulescu-Niger (born Nicolae Gheorghiu; January 2, 1861 – June 3, 1944) was a Romanian prose writer, playwright and poet.

Born in Bârlad, his father Radu Gheorghiu was a merchant. He attended high school in Brăila (under the name Nicolae Rădulescu, from his father's first name) and in Bârlad (as Nicolae Gheorghiu Rădulescu). He worked as a clerk at the Religious Affairs and Arts Ministry. Starting in 1883, Rădulescu was an editor for various publications: Opinia, Revista nouă, Revista literară, Revista copiilor; he also headed Apărătorul săteanului magazine. His verses appeared in Literatorul.

Rădulescu's first book was the 1879 novel Fiii ucigașului. This was followed by additional novels (Străin în țara lui, 1900; Tribunul poporului, 1903; Măria-sa ogorul, 1907; Viață de artistă, 1925; Omul de cristal, 1930), short story collections (Căpitanul Ropotă, 1893; Deziluzii, 1921; Vulturul îndrăgostit, 1926), theater plays (De pe urma beției, 1906; Poștașul dragostei, 1913; Unirea Mare, 1919) and books of poetry (Rustice, 1893; Glasul apelor, 1915). In 1901, he was awarded the Romanian Academy's prize for the fourth volume of the Rustice cycle. He died in Bucharest.
