= Rădulescu =

Rădulescu is a Romanian patronymic surname dericed from the given name Radu. Notable people with the surname include:

== Sports ==
- Alex Rădulescu, tennis player
- Costel Rădulescu, soccer coach and manager
- Mircea Rădulescu, soccer coach

== Politicians ==
- Victor Rădulescu-Pogoneanu, diplomat, politician, and former political prisoner
- Gogu Rădulescu, communist politician
- Ion Heliade Rădulescu, writer and politician
- Iulian Rădulescu, Roma activist and politician
- Aurel Rădulescu, cleric and politician
- Constantin Rădulescu-Motru, philosopher and politician

== Writers ==
- Domnica Radulescu, Romanian-American writer
- Marta Rădulescu, novelist
- Mihai Rădulescu, writer, art critic, and former political prisoner
- Neagu Rădulescu, writer
- Nicolae G. Rădulescu-Niger, poet, playwright and novelist
- Răzvan Rădulescu, screenwriter and novelist

== Other ==
- Andrei Rădulescu, judge
- Edgar Rădulescu, general
- Dem Rădulescu, actor
- Horațiu Rădulescu, composer
- Ion A. Rădulescu-Pogoneanu, pedagogue
- Magdalena Rădulescu (1902–1983), Romanian painter
- Mihaela Rădulescu, television personality
- Șerban Rădulescu-Zoner, historian, former political prisoner and civil society activist

== See also ==
- Răducan, Răducanu
