= Orquesta Sinfónica de Tenerife =

Auditorio de Tenerife

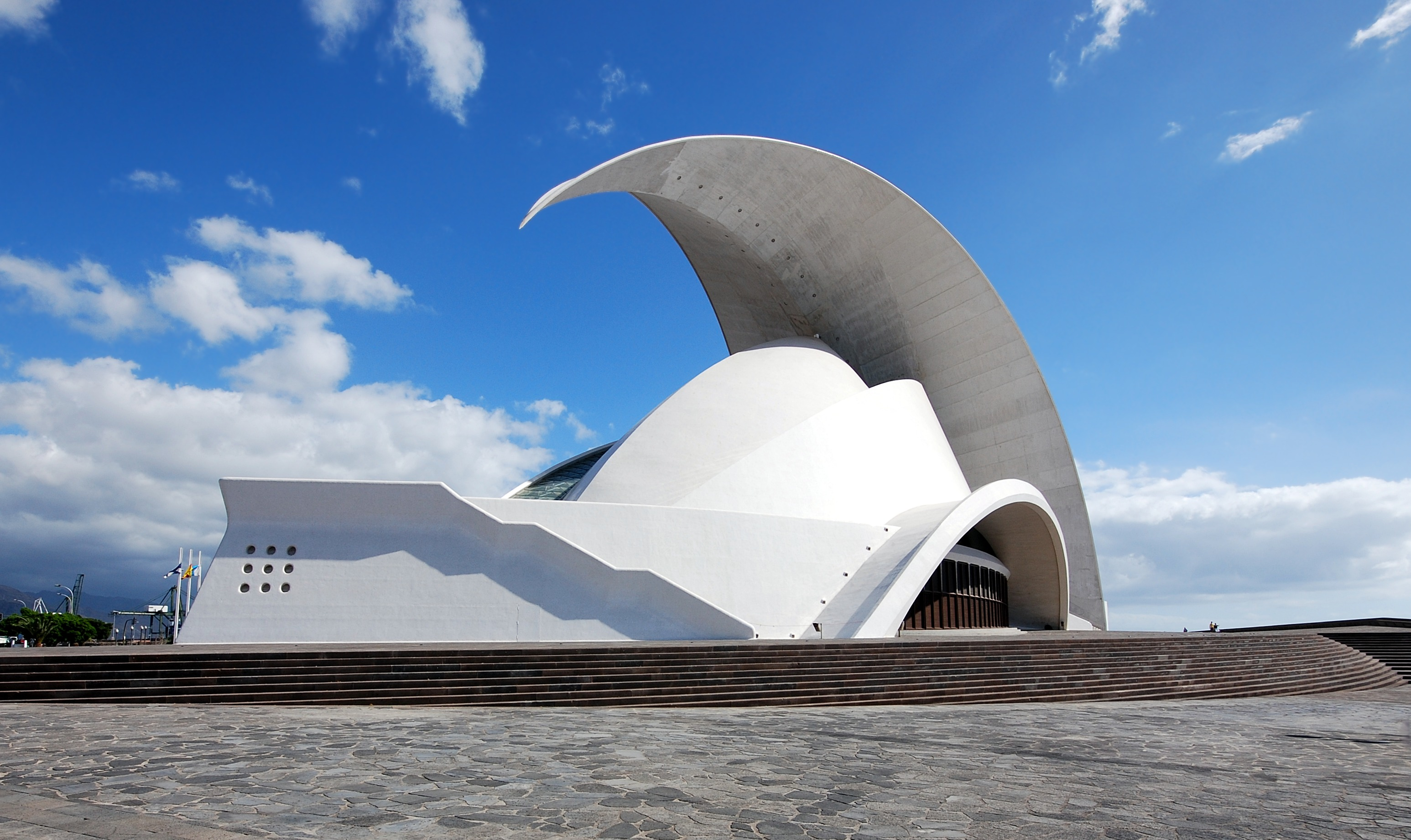
Auditorio de Tenerife

The Orquesta Sinfónica de Tenerife (OST, "Tenerife Symphony Orchestra") is an orchestra in the city of Santa Cruz de Tenerife on the island of Tenerife in the Canary Islands. The Tenerife Symphony Orchestra is considered one of the best symphony orchestras in Spain.

Founded as the Orquesta de Cámara de Canarias in 1935, it became a symphony orchestra in 1970. Its seat is the Auditorio de Tenerife. Much of its prestige is due to Víctor Pablo Pérez, who conducted the orchestra between 1986 and 2006. From 2006 until 2010 the orchestra conductor was Lü Jia. Since then Michal Nesterowics and Antonio Mendez have been the ensemble's principal conductors. The orchestra has performed in the main symphony halls in Spain, Germany and the United Kingdom. They have played with several renowned artists including Krystian Zimerman and Kyung Wha Chung.

The OST has been awarded with the Grand prix de l'Académie française du disque lyrique, the Cannes Classical Awards, Diapason d'Or (in 1994 and 1995) and the Choc of Le Monde de la musique magazine. It also received the Premio Ondas in its 1992 and 1996 editions.
