= Radu (surname) =

Radu is a Romanian surname, and may refer to:

- Alexandru Radu (born 1982), Romanian football player
- Alexandru Radu (born 1997), Romanian football player
- Andrei Radu (born 1996), Romanian football player
- Carmen Radu (21st century), Romanian businessperson
- Constantin Radu (1945–2020), Romanian football player
- Constantin Radu (1912–unknown), Romanian long-distance runner
- Cosmin Radu (born 1981), Romanian water polo player
- Dan Ghica-Radu (born 1955), Romanian Land Forces general
- Daniel Radu (born 1957), Romanian judo practitioner
- Daniel Radu (born 1959), Romanian boxer
- Daniel Radu (born 1977), Romanian water polo player
- Demetriu Radu (1861–1920), Romanian bishop
- Elena Radu (born 1975), Romanian sprint canoer
- Elena-Luminița Radu-Cosma (born 1972), Romanian chess player
- Elie Radu (1853–1931), Romanian civil engineer and academic
- Eugen Radu (born 1978), Romanian luger
- Florian Radu (1920–1991), Romanian football player
- Gelu Radu (born 1957), Romanian weightlifter
- Ionel Radu (born 1969), Romanian handball player
- Ionuț Radu (born 1997), Romanian football player
- Kenneth Radu (born 1945), Canadian writer
- Liviu Radu (1948–2015), Romanian science-fiction writer
- Maria Radu (born 1959), Romanian long-distance runner
- Marin Radu (born 1956), Romanian football player
- Marina Radu (born 1984), Canadian water polo player
- Marius Radu (born 1977), Romanian football player
- Marius Radu (born 1992), Romanian swimmer
- Michael Radu (1947–2009), Romanian-American political scientist
- Paul Radu (born 1975–76), Romanian investigative journalist
- Roy Radu (born 1963), Canadian rugby union player
- Sergiu Radu (born 1977), Romanian football player
- Silvia Radu (sculptor) (1935–2025), Romanian sculptor, potter, and painter
- Silvia Radu (born 1972), Moldovan politician
- Ștefan Radu (born 1986), Romanian football player
- Valentin Radu (born 1956), Romanian conductor

== See also ==
- Radu (given name)
- Rădulescu (surname)
- Răducan (surname)
- Răducanu (surname)
