= Radu (given name) =

Romanian given name

- Pronunciation: [ˈradu]
- Gender: Male

Origin
- Origin: Slavic
- Meaning: rad (the happy one)
- Region of origin: Romania

Other names
- Related names: Rada (female first name), Radoslav

Radu is a masculine Romanian given name of Slavic etymological origin, derived from the Old Church Slavonic root rad- (cf. радъ "glad"). Radu became widespread among the (non-Slavic) Romanians because of Radu Negru's status as legendary founder of Wallachia, a historical Romanian state. Many Wallachian and some Moldavian voivodes or princes have been named Radu.

Notable people named Radu include:

== A ==
- Radu Albot (born 1989), Moldovan tennis player
- Radu Aldulescu (1922–2006), Romanian-Italian cellist
- Radu Aldulescu (born 1954), Romanian novelist
- Radu Almășan (born 1980), Romanian singer of the band Bosquito
- Radu Aricescu, Romanian-British molecular neuroscientist

== B ==
- Radu Barbu (born 1989), Romanian football player
- Radu Băldescu (1888–1953), Romanian general during World War II
- Radu Bălescu (1932–2006), Romanian and Belgian physicist
- Radu Beligan (1918–2016), Romanian actor and director
- Radu Berceanu (born 1953), Romanian engineer and politician
- Radu Bîrzan (born 1999), Romanian football player
- Radu Boboc (born 1999), footballer
- Radu Boureanu (1906–1997), Romanian poet and writer
- Radu Budișteanu (1902–1991), activist of the Iron Guard
- Radu Buzescu (fl. c. 1593–1601), boyar of Wallachia during the reign of Michael the Brave

== C ==
- Radu Câmpeanu (1922–2016), Romanian politician and jurist
- Radu Catan (born 1989), Moldovan football player
- Radu Chiriac (born 2000), Romanian football player
- Radu Ciobanu (born 1975), Romanian football player
- Radu Cioculescu (1901–1961), Romanian writer, editor, and political activist
- Radu Ciuceanu (1928–2022), Romanian historian and politician
- Radu Crișan (born 1996), Romanian football player

== D ==
- Radu Dărăban (born 1983), Romanian fencer
- Traian Rafael Radu Demetrescu (1866–1896), Romanian writer
- Radu Doicaru (born 1979), Romanian football player
- Radu Drăgușin (born 2002), Romanian football player
- Radu Dudescu (1894–1983), Romanian architect

== F ==
- Radu Filipescu (born 1955), Romanian anti-communist dissident
- Radu Florescu (1925–2014), Romanian historian and academic, professor at Boston College

== G ==
- Radu Gabrea (1937–2017), Romanian filmmaker
- Radu Pavel Gheo (born 1969), Romanian writer
- Radu Ghiță (born 1990), Romanian handball player
- Radu Gînsari (born 1991), Moldovan football player
- Radu Goldiș (born 1947), Romanian-American jazz guitarist
- Adrian Radu Gontariu (born 1984), Romanian volleyball player
- Radu Grigorovici (1911–2008), Romanian physicist
- Radu Gyr (pen name of Radu Demetrescu; 1905–1975), Romanian poet and writer

== I ==
- Radu Irimescu (1890–1975), Romanian businessman, politician, and diplomat
- Radu Ivan (born 1969), Romanian judo practitioner

== J ==
- Radu Jercan (1945–2012), Romanian football player
- Radu Jude (born 1977), Romanian filmmaker

== K ==
- Radu Klapper (1937–2006), Romanian-Israeli poet and author
- Radu Korne (1895–1949), Romanian general during World War II

== L ==
- Radu Lazăr (born 1947), Romanian water polo player
- Radu Lecca (1890–1980), Romanian spy and journalist
- Radu Lefter (born 1970), Romanian football player
- Radu Leonte (born 1991), Romanian football player
- Radu Lupu (1945–2022), Romanian pianist

== M ==
- Radu Malfatti (born 1943), Austrian trombone player and composer
- Radu Manicatide (1912–2004), Romanian engineer and aircraft constructor
- Radu Marculescu, electrical engineer
- Radu Mareș (1941–2016), Romanian writer and journalist
- Radu Marian (born 1977), Moldavian singer sopranist
- Radu Ștefan Mazăre (born 1968), Romanian politician
- Radu Mihăileanu (born 1958), Romanian-French actor and filmmaker
- Radu Mîțu (born 1994), Romanian football player
- Radu Motreanu (born 1998), Romanian football player
- Radu Muntean (born 1971), Romanian filmmaker

== N ==
- Radu Negulescu (born 1941), Romanian table tennis player
- Radu Neguț (born 1981), Romanian football player
- Radu Niculescu (born 1975), Romanian football player
- Radu Nunweiller (born 1944), Romanian football player

== P ==
- Radu Paladi (1927–2013), Romanian composer, pianist, and conductor
- Radu Paliciuc (born 1988), Romanian basketball player
- Radu Pamfil (1951–2009), Romanian football player
- Miron Radu Paraschivescu (1911–1971), Romanian writer
- Radu Petrescu (born 1980), Romanian rugby referee
- Radu Marian Petrescu (born 1982), Romanian football referee
- Radu Podgorean (born 1955), Romanian politician
- Radu Poklitaru (born 1972), Moldovan choreographer
- Dumitru Radu Popa (born 1949), Romanian-American writer
- Dumitru Radu Popescu (1935–2023), Romanian writer
- Mihai Radu Pricop (1950–2018), Romanian politician

== R ==
- Radu Rebeja (born 1973), Moldovan football player
- Radu Rogac (born 1995), Moldovan football player
- Prince Radu of Romania (born 1960 as Radu Duda), husband of Margareta of Romania, pretender to the Romanian throne
- Radu Rosetti (1853–1926), Moldavian and Romanian politician and writer
- Radu D. Rosetti (1874–1964), Romanian writer
- Radu R. Rosetti (1877–1949), Romanian general and historian

== S ==
- Radu Sabău (born 1968), Romanian water polo player
- Radu Sabo (born 1971), Romanian football player
- Radu Scîrneci (1926−2015), Romanian alpine skier
- Radu Scoarță (born 1999), Romanian football player
- Radu Simion (1940–2015), Romanian pan flute player
- Radu Sîrbu (born 1978), Moldovan pop singer, formerly of the boy band O-Zone
- Radu Stanca (1920–1962), poet, playwright, theatre director
- Radu Stroe (born 1949), Romanian navigational engineer and politician
- Radu Lucian Sulica, Romanian-American physician and laryngologist

== T ==
- Radu Țârle (born 1967), Romanian politician
- Radu Timofte (1949–2009), Romanian soldier, politician, and spy chief
- Radu Troi (born 1949), Romanian football player
- Radu Țuculescu (1949–2025), Romanian novelist and playwright
- Radu Tudoran (1910–1992), Romanian novelist

== V ==
- Radu Varia (born 1940), art critic and historian
- Radu Vasile (1942–2013), former prime minister of Romania
- Radu G. Vlădescu (1886–1964), Romanian professor of veterinary medicine
- Radu Voina (born 1950), Romanian handball player

== Z ==
- Radu Zaharia (born 1989), football player

== Wallachian rulers ==
Listed chronologically:

- Radu Negru (Radu the Black; born 1269), legendary founder of Wallachia
- Radu I of Wallachia (fl. c. 1377–1383), Voivode of Wallachia, sometimes identified as Radu Negru
- Radu II of Wallachia (Radu II Praznaglava, Radu II Empty Head, Radu the Bald; died c. 1428), reigned intermittently from 1420–1427
- Radu the Handsome (Radu cel Frumos, Radu III of Wallachia; 1437/1439–1475), the younger brother of Vlad III the Impaler
- Radu IV the Great (Radu cel Mare; 1467–1508), son of Vlad Călugărul, reigned 1495–1508
- Radu Bădica (died 1524), son of Radu IV the Great, reigned 1523–1524
- Radu of Afumați (Radu de la Afumaţi; died 1529), son of Radu cel Mare, reigned intermittently from 1522–1529
- Radu Paisie (Radu VII Paise, Petru I; fl. 1534-1545), son of Radu cel Mare, reigned almost continuously from 1535–1545
- Radu Ilie Haidăul (died 1558), son of Radu of Afumați, reigned 1552–1553
- Radu Mihnea (1586–1626), son of Mihnea Turcitul, reigned from 1601–1602, 1611, 1611–1616, and 1620–1623
- Radu Șerban (died 1620), reigned from 1602–1610 and in 1611
- Radu Iliaș (died 1632), son of Alexandru Iliaș, reigned in 1632
- Mihnea III Radu (1613–1660)
- Radu Leon (also Radu the Oyster-seller; died 1669), son of Leon Tomșa, reigned 1664–1669

== Other uses ==
- Radu Barvon, a character in the light novel series Trinity Blood
- George Ivașcu, Romanian journalist who used the pen name "Radu Vardaru"
- Sofronie Drincec, Romanian Orthodox bishop born "Radu Ștefan Drincec"

== See also ==
- Radu (surname)
