= Ismar =

Ismar or ISMAR can refer to:

- Ismar (river), a river in Giurgiu County, Romania
- Ismar (given name), a masculine given name
- Alvania ismar, extinct sea snail species
