= Siliștea (Valea Porumbenilor) =

- Location within Romania

Location
- Country: Romania
- Counties: Giurgiu County

Physical characteristics
- Source
  - coordinates: 43°58′51″N 25°44′11″E
  - elevation: 86 m (282 ft)
- Mouth: Valea Porumbenilor
  - location: Upstream of Cucuruzu
  - coordinates: 44°03′20″N 25°42′57″E
  - elevation: 82 m (269 ft)
- Length: 12 km (7.5 mi)
- Basin size: 56 km^{2} (22 sq mi)

Basin features
- Progression: Valea Porumbenilor→ Câlniștea→ Neajlov→ Argeș→ Danube→ Black Sea

The Siliștea is a right tributary of the river Valea Porumbenilor in Romania. It flows into the Valea Porumbenilor near Cucuruzu. Its length is 12 km (7.5 mi) and its basin size is 56 km^{2} (22 sq mi).
