= Romania in the Middle Ages =

The Middle Ages in Romania began shortly after the withdrawal of the Roman legions from the former Roman province of Dacia in the late 3rd century and with the start of the Early Middle Ages and the Migration Period that followed afterwards respectively. It subsequently came to an end with the reign of Domn Michael the Brave (1593–1601) who managed, for a short time between 1599 and 1600, to rule Wallachia, Moldavia, and Transylvania together, the three principalities whose territories were to be united some three centuries later to form modern and contemporary Romania.

Over most of this period, Banat, Crișana, Maramureș, and Transylvania – now regions in Romania to the west of the Carpathian Mountains – were part of the Kingdom of Hungary. They were divided into several types of administrative units, such as "counties" and "seats". The heads of the Transylvanian counties or "counts" were subordinated to a special royal official called voivode, but the province was seldom treated as a single unit, since the Székely and Saxon seats were administered separately. In the kingdom, Romanian peasants, being Orthodox, were exempt from the tithe, an ecclesiastical tax payable by all Roman Catholic commoners. However, Romanian noblemen slowly lost the ability to participate in political life, as the 14th-century monarchs pursued a zealous pro-Catholic policy. Their position became even worse after 1437 when the so-called "Union of Three Nations", an alliance of the Hungarian noblemen, the Székelys, and the Saxons, was formed in order to crush the Bobâlna peasant uprising.

Wallachia, the first independent medieval state between the Carpathians and the lower Danube was created when Basarab I (c. 1310–1352) terminated the suzerainty of the King of Hungary with his victory in the battle of Posada in 1330. The independence of Moldavia, to the east of the Carpathians, was achieved by Bogdan I (1359–1365), a nobleman from the Voivodeship of Maramureș, who led a revolt against the former ruler who was appointed by the Hungarian monarch. The independence of the two principalities, however, was rarely secure, and vassalage to multiple states became an important aspect of their diplomacy. Although Wallachia paid tribute to the Ottoman Empire from 1417, and Moldavia from 1456, their two medieval monarchs, Mircea the Old of Wallachia (1386–1418) and Stephen the Great of Moldavia (1457–1504) conducted successful military operations against the Ottoman Turks. The two principalities' trade with other parts of Europe began to decrease after the last decades of the 15th century. Before this the sale of hides, grain, honey, and wax to the Holy Roman Empire, Venice, and Poland, and the import of silk, weapons and other manufactured goods from these areas had been widespread, but by the end of the 16th century the Ottoman Empire became the main market for Romanian products.

Transylvania, together with the neighboring counties, gained the status of an autonomous state under Ottoman suzerainty after the central territories of the Kingdom of Hungary had been annexed by the Ottomans in 1541. The fall of the kingdom also deprived Wallachia and Moldavia of their main ally in the struggle against the Ottoman Empire. In 1594, Michael the Brave of Wallachia joined the anti-Ottoman alliance initiated by Pope Clement VIII. After a series of victory over the Ottomans, he turned against Transylvania and Moldavia where pro-Polish and pro-Ottoman princes were reigning. He invaded and occupied Transylvania in 1599, and Moldavia in 1600. Although the personal union of the three countries collapsed four months later, it served as an ideal for later generations working for the unification of the lands that now form Romania.

== Early Middle Ages (late 8th century–early 13th century) ==
At the end of the 8th century, the establishment of the Khazar Khaganate north of the Caucasus Mountains created an obstacle in the path of nomadic people moving westward. In the following period, the local population of the Carpathian–Danubian area profited from the peaceful political climate and a unitary material culture, called "Dridu", that developed in the region. Finds from the Dridu settlements, such as coulters and sickles, confirm the role of agriculture in their economy.

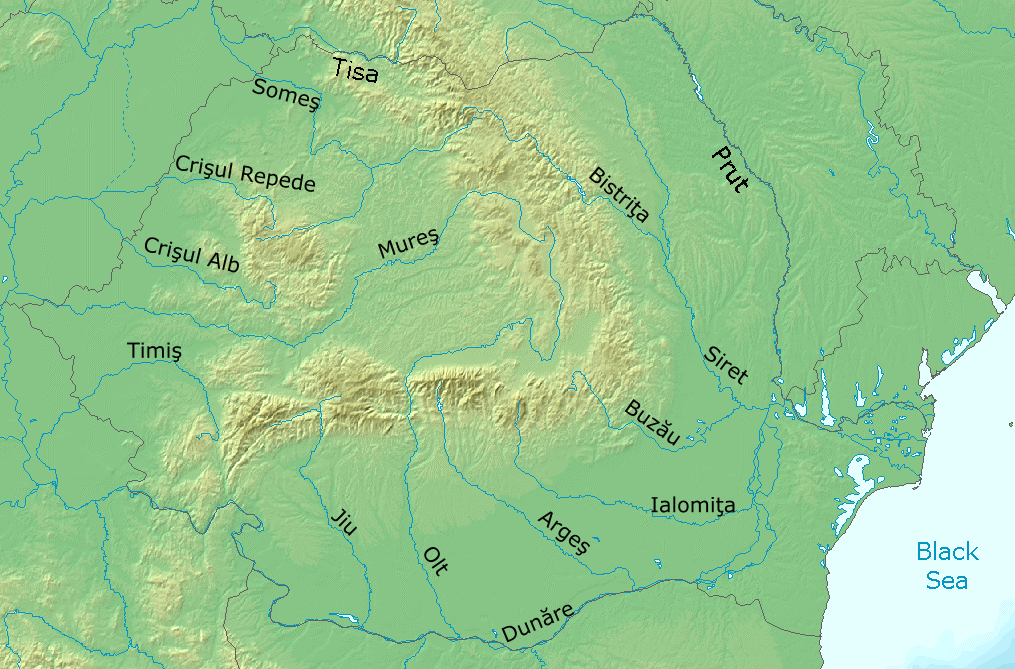
The Carpathian Mountains and the main rivers in modern Romania

In the 9th century centrifugal movements commenced in the Khazar Kaghanate. One of the subject peoples, the Hungarians, left the Khanate and settled in the region between the rivers Don and Dniester. They abandoned the steppes and crossed the Carpathians around 896. According to the 13th-century Gesta Hungarorum ("Deeds of the Hungarians") at the time of the Hungarian conquest, Transylvania was inhabited by "Vlachs and Slavs" (blasij et sclaui) and ruled by Gelou, "a certain Vlach" (quidam blacus), while Crișana was inhabited by several peoples, among them Székelys. Whether the author of the Gesta had any knowledge of the real conditions of the turn of the 9th and 10th centuries remains debated by historians.

In 953, the gyula, the second leader in rank of the Hungarian tribal federation, converted to Christianity in Constantinople. Around that time, according to the Byzantine Emperor Constantine VII, the Hungarians controlled the region on the border of modern Romania and Hungary along the rivers Timiș, Mureș, Criș, Tisa and Toutis. In 1003, as the Annals of Hildesheim narrates, Stephen I, the first crowned monarch of Hungary (c. 1000–1038) "led an army against his maternal uncle, Gyula, and occupied Gyula's country.

Stephen I granted privileges to the Roman Catholic Church, for example by ordering the general imposition of the tithe upon the population. Burials in most local pre-Christian cemeteries, for example at Hunedoara, only ceased around 1100. Stephen I also divided his kingdom, including the territories of modern Romania he had occupied, into counties, that is administrative units around royal fortresses, each administered by a royal official called count. In time the voivode, a higher royal official first attested in 1176, became the principal of all the counts in Transylvania. In contrast with Transylvania, the counts in modern Banat and Crișana remained in direct contact with the king who appointed and replaced them at will.

From the end of the 9th century the Pechenegs controlled the territories to the east and south of the Carpathians. According to the Eymund's saga, they fought together with the Blökkumen ("Romanians") in the Kievan Rus' in the 1010s. The Pechenegs were swept aside from their territories by the Cumans between 1064 and 1078. A late variant of the oldest Turkish chronicle, the Oghuz-name relates that the Cumans defeated many nations, including the Ulâq ("Romanians"). Some of the Pechenegs fled into the Kingdom of Hungary where they were employed to guard the border districts, for instance in Transylvania.

The 11th-century settlements in Transylvania are characterized by small huts with ceramic assemblages marked by clay cauldrons. The increasing number of coin finds suggests that the province experienced economic growth in the late 11th century. The first document pertaining to the province is a royal charter of 1075 referring to taxes on salt levied at Turda. The earliest precious metal mine in medieval Transylvania, the silver mine at Rodna was first mentioned in 1235.

In the 12th and 13th centuries hospites ("guest settlers") arrived in Transylvania from Germany and from the French-speaking regions on the river Rhine who in time became collectively known as "Saxons". In 1224 Andrew II of Hungary (1205–1235) granted special liberties to the Saxons who had settled in southern Transylvania. For instance, they were authorized to choose their local leaders; only the head of the entire community, the count of Sibiu, was appointed by the king. They were also granted the right to use "the forest of the Romanians and the Pechenegs". The first references to viniculture in Transylvania are connected to the vineyards of the hospites of Cricău, Ighiu, and Romos.

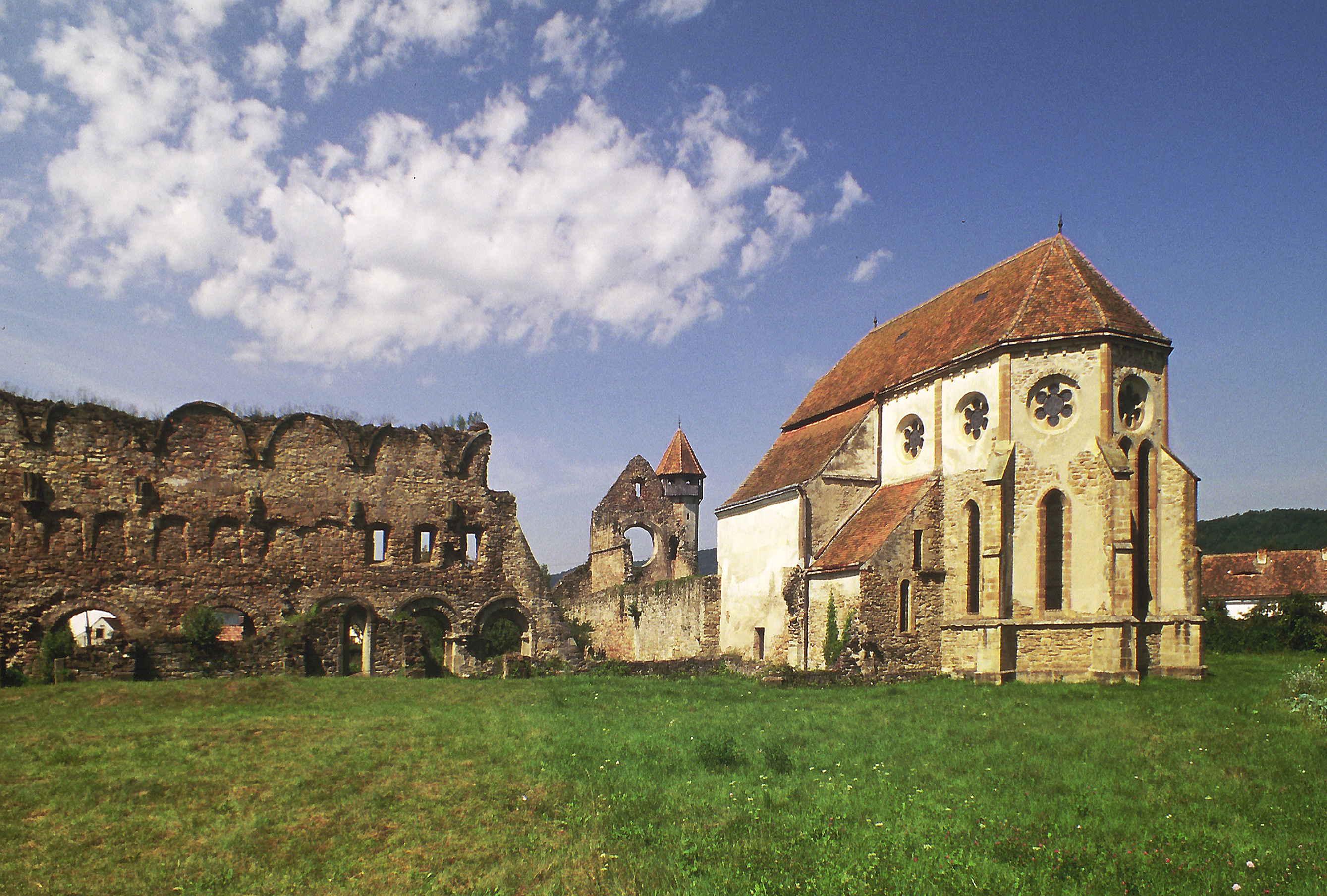
Ruins of the Romanesque Cârța Monastery (German: Kloster Kerz), Cârța, Sibiu County, southern Transylvania.

As a result of the Saxon immigration, the Székelys – Hungarian-speaking free warriors cultivating communal lands – were transferred to the southeast of the province. From the 13th century they were governed independently from the voivode by a royal official, the count of the Székelys. Besides the Saxons, the Cistercians became the agents of expansion in Transylvania. When their abbey at Cârța was established in the early 13th century, Andrew II ordered that the strip of land running up to the mountains between the rivers Olt, Cârțișoara and Arpaș be transferred from the Romanians to the new monastery.

Following the defeat of the Cumans by the Mongols on the river Kalka in 1223, some chieftains of the western Cuman tribes accepted the authority of the king of Hungary. Their conversion led to the creation of the Roman Catholic Diocese of Cumania to the east of the Carpathians. However, the Orthodox Romanian population of the territory received the sacraments from "some pseudo-bishops of the Greek rite", according to a papal bull of 1234. In 1233 Oltenia was organized into a military frontier zone of the Kingdom of Hungary, called the Banate of Severin.

The expansion across the Carpathians was stopped by the invasion of the Mongols that lasted from March 31, 1241 to April, 1242. It was a major watershed in the medieval history of the region: although the number of casualties is disputed, even the most prudent estimates do not go below 15 percent of the total population.

== High Middle Ages (1242–1396) ==
=== Outer-Carpathian regions ===
After the withdrawal from the Kingdom of Hungary, the Mongol forces halted at Sarai (now Russia) on the Volga River where their leader, Batu Khan set up his own capital. Henceforth, the steppes between the rivers Dnieper and Danube were under the influence of the Mongols of the Volga, known as the Golden Horde. From the 1260s, a relative of Batu, Nogai Khan settled at Isaccea on the Lower Danube and became the absolute master of the neighboring regions. He made himself independent of the Golden Horde around 1280, but was killed in a battle in 1299.

By the middle of the 14th century, the westernmost Mongol territories had become subject to frequent Polish and Hungarian military offensives. Grand Prince Olgierd of Lithuania penetrated farther into the territories controlled by the Golden Horde than any European army had hitherto done. He won a major victory over the united Mongol troops on the Dnieper near the Black Sea in 1363.

=== Intra-Carpathian regions ===
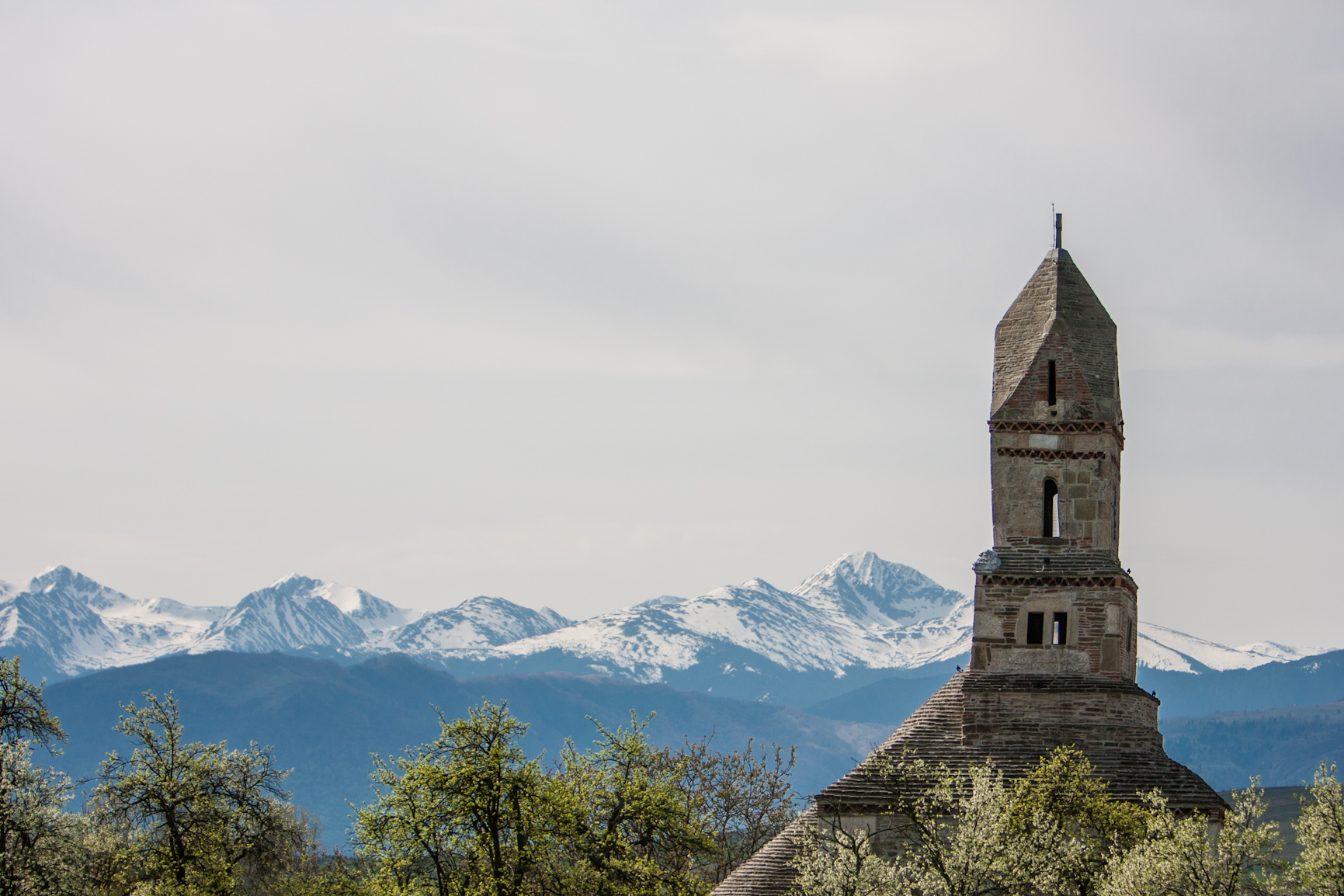
Romanian Orthodox church at Densuș

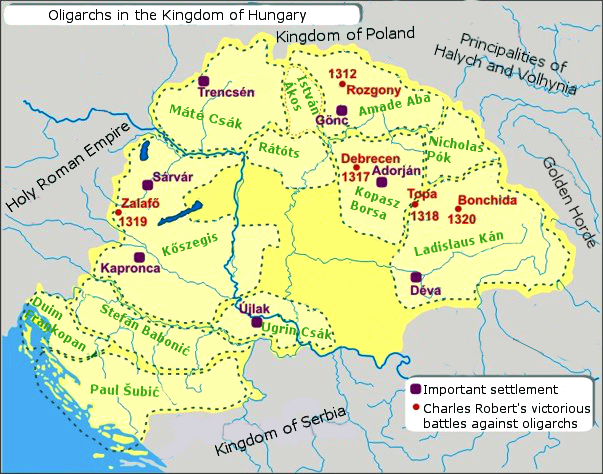
The domains of Ladislaus Kán and other oligarchs in the Kingdom of Hungary in the early 14th century

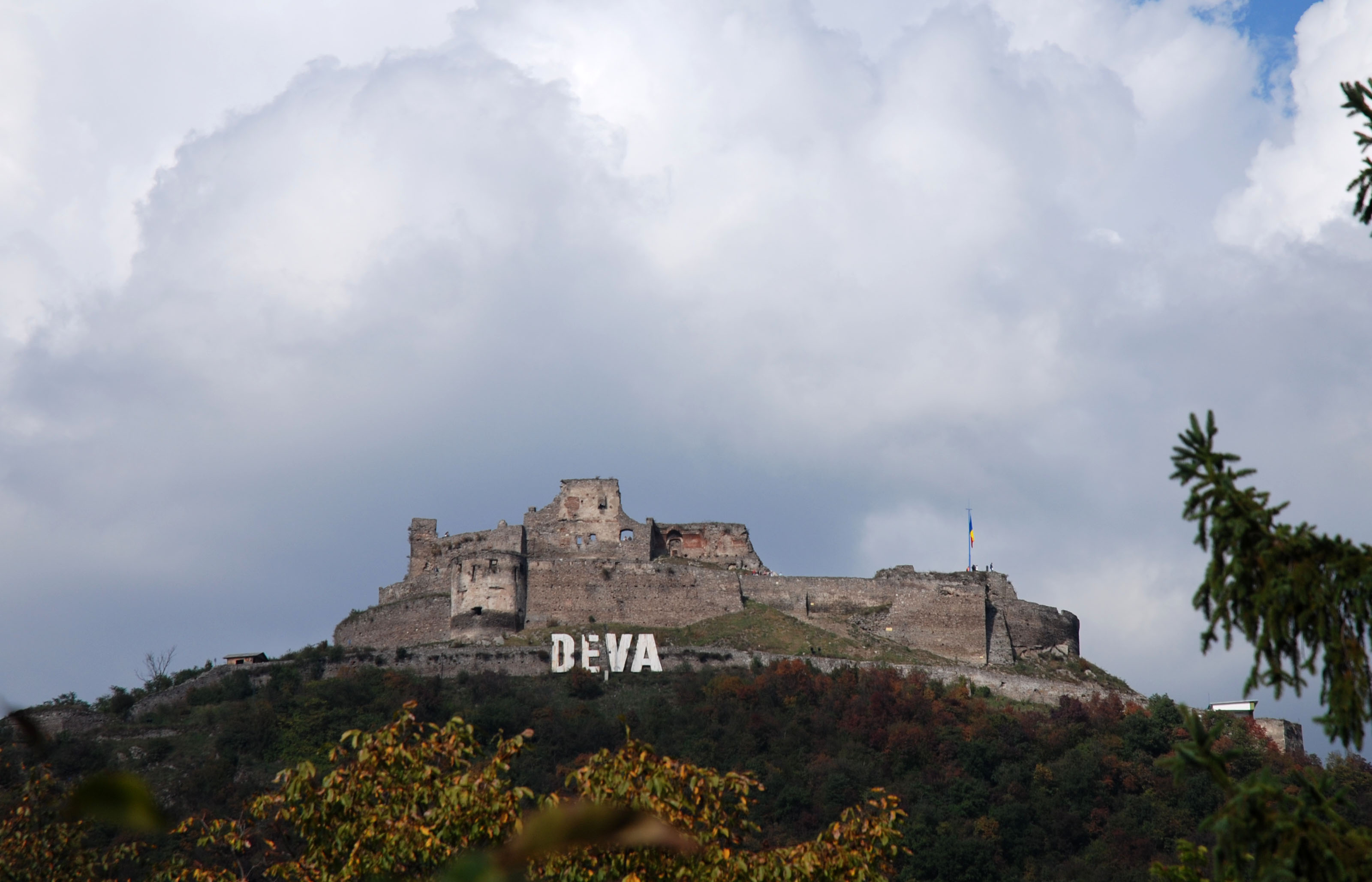
Ladislaus Kán's fortress at Deva

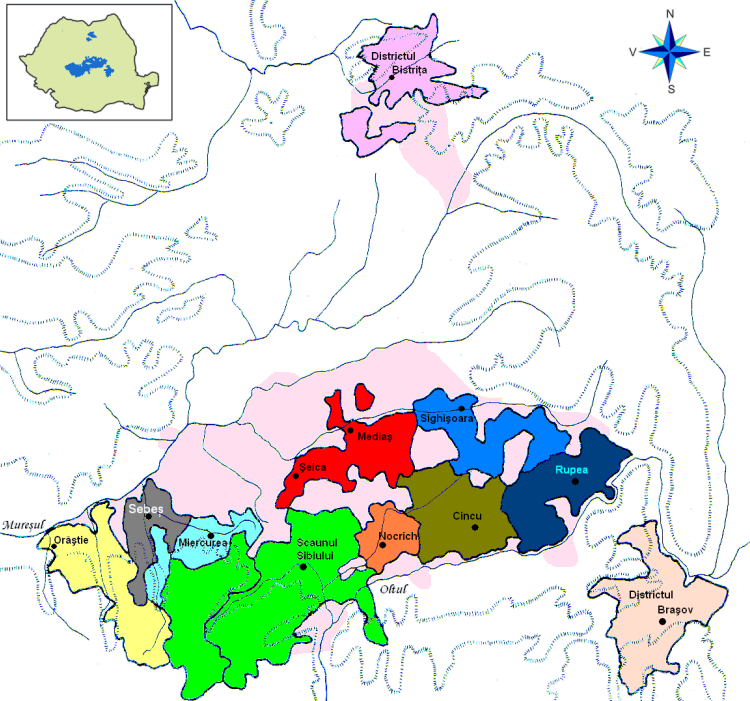
Saxon seats in Transylvania

Having been raided twice by the Mongols within a single year, Transylvania felt the consequences of the invasion of 1241–1242 for more than two decades. The administrative centers of the province, such as Alba Iulia and Cetatea de Baltă, had been destroyed. Due to the severe depopulation, a process of organized colonization commenced that lasted for several decades. For example, a new wave of colonization resulted in the establishment of the Saxon seats of Sighișoara and Mediaș; and the lord of Ilia received, in 1292, royal permission to settle Romanians in the lands he owned.

Since only castles built of stone and walled towns had been able to resist Mongol attacks, following the withdrawal of the Mongols the kings encouraged both the landowners and the townspeople to build stone fortifications. New stone fortresses were built, for example, at Codlea, Rimetea, and Unguraș. The process of urbanization was characterized by the predominance of the Saxon towns: out of the eight towns in Transylvania, only Alba Iulia and Dej were situated in the counties. A charter referring to inns, bakeries, and bathhouses in Rodna proves the city-like way of life of its inhabitants. Salt was still the most important item of trade in this period, but trading with oxen, maidservants, and wine is also documented in royal charters.

In 1257, Béla IV of Hungary (1235–1270) appointed his eldest son, the future Stephen V (1270–1272) to govern the kingdom's territories to the east of the Danube. Here the younger king ceded a significant part of his royal domains to noblemen. The first years of the reign of Ladislaus IV of Hungary (1272–1290), were characterized by civil wars throughout the entire kingdom. In Transylvania, the Saxons engaged in a local conflict with the bishop, took Alba Iulia and set fire to the cathedral. The series of wars continued in 1285 with a second Mongol invasion. During its initial stage, the Székelys, the Romanians and the Saxons successfully blocked the Mongols' access and later organized a series of ambushes provoking panic among the retreating invaders.

By that time, the Romanians' military role had expanded from their original task of defending the kingdom's frontiers. They participated in several military campaigns, for example against Bohemia in 1260 and against Austria in 1291. Their economic role became also recognized, since their pastoral activities connected to cloth production of the Saxon settlements. To the monarchs, they paid a special tax in sheep, called the "fiftieth". Andrew III of Hungary (1290–1301) even ordered, in 1293, that all the Romanians who had been settled without royal permission on noble domains be returned to the royal estate of Armeni.

In the last decades of the 13th century, congregatio generalis ("general assembly") convoked by the monarchs or their representatives became an important organ of court system. For instance, the general assembly convoked in 1279 by Ladislaus IV for seven counties – among them Bihor, Crasna, Sătmar, and Zărand in the territory what is now Romania – ended with sentencing a despotic person to death. The first charter referring to a general assembly of the Transylvanian counties was recorded in 1288. A general assembly of the Transylvanian nobles, Saxons, Székelys and Romanians was convoked personally by the monarch in 1291.

When Andrew III died in 1301, the entire kingdom was in the hands of a dozen powerful noblemen. Among them, Roland Borsa ruled Crișana, Theodore Vejtehi gained the upper hand in the Banat, and Ladislaus Kán governed Transylvania. The latter's authority was also recognized by the Saxons and the Székelys. He even assumed royal prerogatives, such as taking over lands lacking rightful owners. After 1310, he acknowledged Charles I of Hungary (1301–1342) as his sovereign, but in fact continued to rule independently. The king who transferred his residence to Timișoara in 1315 could only strengthen his authority after a long series of confrontations. For instance, Ciceu, the last stronghold of Ladislaus Kán's sons surrendered in 1321.

After the king's victory, one of his loyal adherents, Thomas Szécsényi was appointed voivode who suppressed a Saxon revolt in 1324. At that time, the autonomous Saxon province was divided into seats, each administered by a judge appointed by the king. In appreciation of the Transylvanian noblemen's services in the crushing of the revolt, Charles I exempted them from the taxes they had so far paid to the voivodes.

In this period, one of the major incentives for the growth of Transylvanian towns was the trade with Wallachia and Moldavia. For instance, Brașov was granted a staple right in 1369 with respect to the trade in cloth from Poland or Germany. Thereafter, foreign merchants had to sell their most sought-after merchandise, broadcloth to the tradesmen of Brașov who resold it in Wallachia in exchange for animals, cotton, wax and honey.

In the 14th century, the name "district" was generalized for the forms of territorial organizations of the Romanians, but only few of them, for instance their district in Bereg County (now in Hungary and Ukraine), achieved official recognition. Maramureș, where Romanians were first mentioned in 1326, was the only district that transformed, around 1380, into a county. Louis I of Hungary (1342–1382) issued a royal decree in 1366 which prescribed firm judicial measures against "the malefactors of any nation, especially Romanians".

Louis I's decree also regulated the legal status of the knezes, the Romanians' local leaders, by establishing a distinction between knezes "brought to" their lands by royal writ whose testimony in court weighed like that of nobles ("noble knezes"), and others whose evidence counted for less ("commoner knezes"). This distinction, however, did not mean real nobility and grant them exemption from royal taxes, even for the noble knezes. Their status corresponded to that of the Hungarian "conditional nobles" whose nobility depended on the specified military services they were to render.

According to a royal decree of 1428, Louis I had also ordered that only Catholics be granted land in the Sebeș district of Timiș county. As a result of official pressure, many Romanian noblemen converted to Catholicism. For example, the members of the powerful Drágffy family turned Catholic in the 15th century. The Ottomans raided Transylvania for the first time in 1394. Sigismund I of Hungary (1387–1437) organized a crusade against them, but the battle of Nicopolis (now Nikopol, Bulgaria) ended in disaster for the Christian forces in 1396.

=== Establishment of Wallachia ===
According to a charter issued by Béla IV of Hungary for the Knights Hospitallers in 1247, at that time at least four polities existed in the area to the south of the Carpathians. Two of them, the cnezats of John and Farcaș were granted to the knights, but the lands ruled by Litovoi and Seneslau were left "to the Olati" ("Romanians") "just as they have owned it". In the 1270s, Litovoi extended his territory and stopped paying tribute to the king, but his army was defeated by the royal forces, and he was killed in the battle.

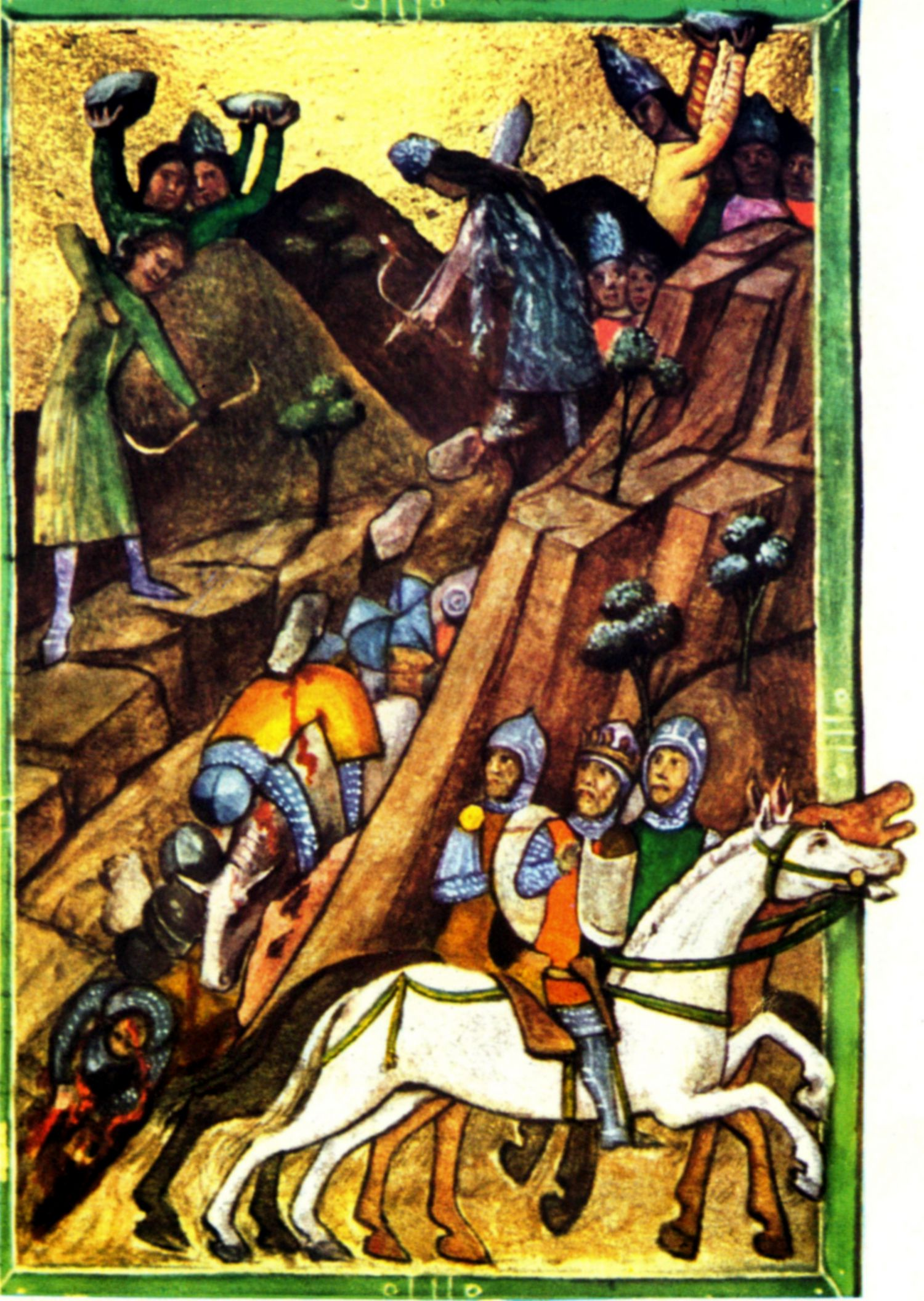
The Battle of Posada in the Vienna Illustrated Chronicle

Romanian historical tradition associates the foundation of Wallachia with the "dismounting of Radu Negru" who crossed the Carpathians from Transylvania accompanied by "Romanians, papists, Saxons, and all kind of men" around 1290. The first sovereign of Wallachia recorded in contemporary sources was Basarab I who obtained international recognition for the independence of the principality by his victory over Charles I of Hungary in the battle of Posada on November 12, 1330. The princes of Wallachia were chosen from among his descendants – either legitimate, or not – by an assembly of the boyars until the 16th century.

The boyars, members of the landed nobility, formed the most important social group in the principality. The vast majority of the population was formed by peasants who were called several names, such as vecini ("neighbors") or rumâni ("Romanians"), in medieval documents. In this period, animals, especially sheep, remained the main item of export, but from the Wallachian Plain great quantities of grain were transported to the Mediterranean area. The basis of the peasants' diet was formed by millet eaten as porridge, while the boyars also used wheat.

The Orthodox Metropolitan See of Wallachia was recognized by the Ecumenical Patriarch of Constantinople in 1359. Wallachia issued its own currency under Vladislav I (1364–c. 1377). The earliest written information about Gypsies in modern Romania, a deed issued by Dan I of Wallachia (c. 1383–1386) refers to Vladislav I's former donation of Gypsies to the Vodița monastery. Later on, all the important monasteries and boyars owned Gipsy slaves.

The Ottomans entered for the first time into Wallachia in 1395. Although the invading troops were defeated somewhere in a rovină ("ragged marshland") in Oltenia, the chaos created by the threat of attacks allowed a group of boyars to put Vlad I the Usurper (1395–1397) on the throne. Thus Mircea I was forced to take refuge in Transylvania, where he agreed to be Sigismund I of Hungary's vassal. He was restored to the throne and participated in the disastrous crusade of Nicopolis organized by Sigismund I.

=== Establishment of Moldavia ===
After 1241 the territory between the Eastern Carpathians and the Dniester was controlled by the Golden Horde.

Nevertheless, the contemporary Thomas Tuscus's reference to the Romanians' conflict with the Ruthenians in 1277 suggests that Romanian political entities existed in northern Moldavia at that time. In 1345 Andrew Lackfi, the count of the Székelys led an army over the Carpathians and occupied this region where a border province was organized by Louis I of Hungary.

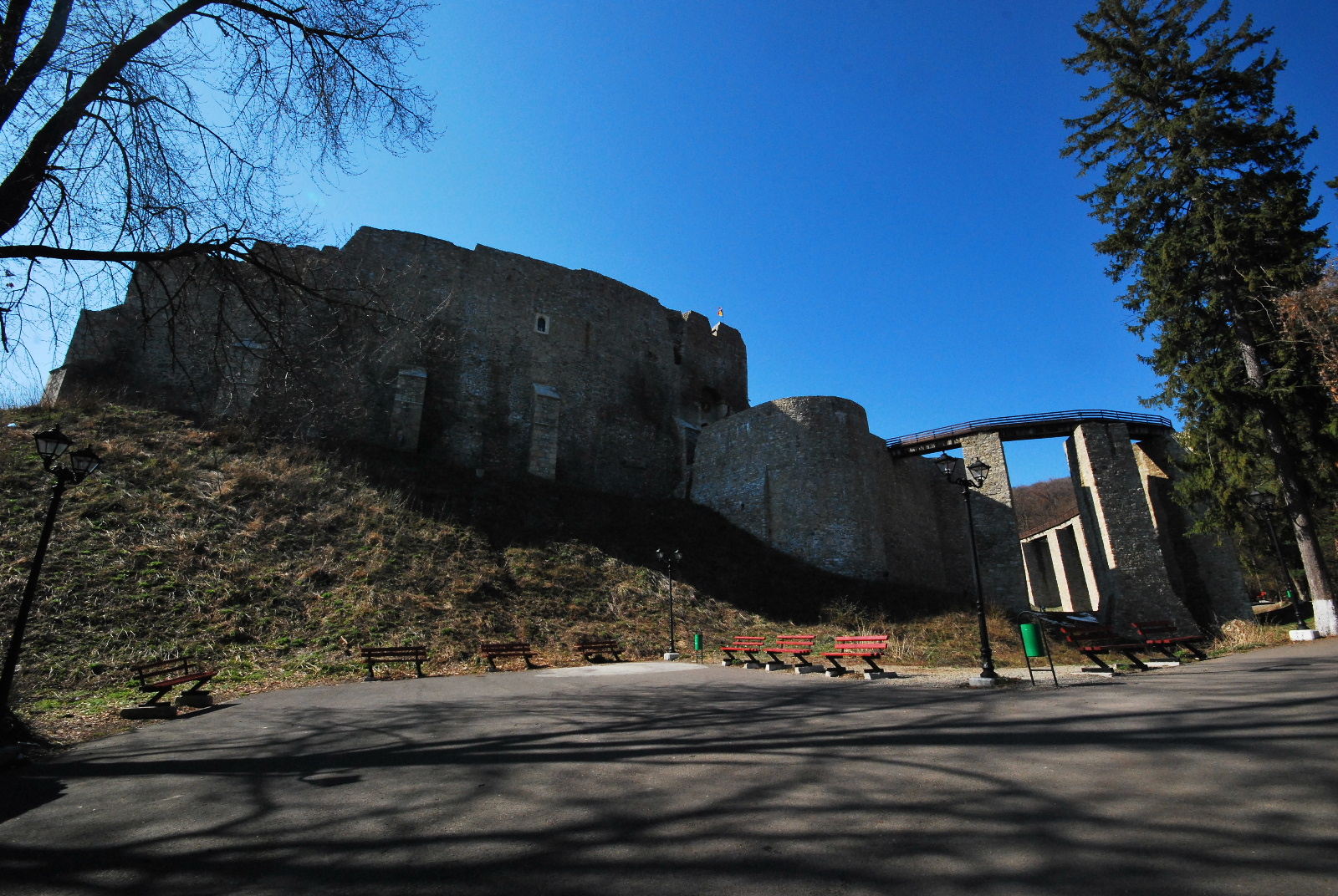
Fortress at Neamț

Romanian historical tradition links the foundation of Moldavia to the "dismounting of Dragoș", a Romanian voivode of the Voivodeship of Maramureș. Although Dragoș was succeeded by his son, Sas, his line did not last long. His descendants were soon expelled by Bogdan, a former voivode of Maramureș who fled to Moldavia and joined with local boyars in a revolt.

In Moldavia, agriculture and animal raising remained the principal economic activities. Similarly to Wallachia, wooden plow remained the main agricultural tool throughout the Middle Ages. The constant clearing of land shows that finding new land was still preferred to crop rotation. The establishment of the principality enhanced the security of travel, thus Moldavia could also profit from the transit trade between Poland and the Black Sea ports. The first local coins were minted in 1377, under Peter I Mușat (c. 1375–1391).

The succession to the throne, similarly to Wallachia, was governed by the hereditary-elective principle. Thus either a legitimate or an illegitimate member of the Mușatin family could be proclaimed prince by an assembly of the boyars. In 1387 Peter I Mușat recognized Władysław II Jagiełło of Poland as his suzerain, but Hungary also maintained its claim of suzerainty over the principality. Therefore, the princes of Moldavia could counterbalance the influence of Poland and Hungary by playing one off against the other.

=== Dobruja ===
After 1242 most of the territory between the Danube and the Black Sea was included in the area dominated by the Mongols. Although the Byzantine Empire reestablished control over the Danube Delta in the 1260s, it fell again under the direct rule of the Golden Horde sometime before 1337. By the end of the 13th century, flourishing communities of Genoese merchants had settled in the towns of Vicina, Chilia and Licostomo.

Towards the middle of the 14th century a state dependent of the Byzantine Empire, known as "the country of Cavarna", developed in the region. Its first known ruler was Balica. He was succeeded by his brother, Dobrotitsa, for whom part of his holdings, Dobruja, received its name. In about 1385 Ivanco became the ruler of the territory, but he soon disappeared during an Ottoman expedition. Dobruja was occupied by Mircea I of Wallachia in 1390 and by the Ottomans in 1395.

== Towards Ottoman domination (1397–1529) ==
=== Intra-Carpathian regions ===
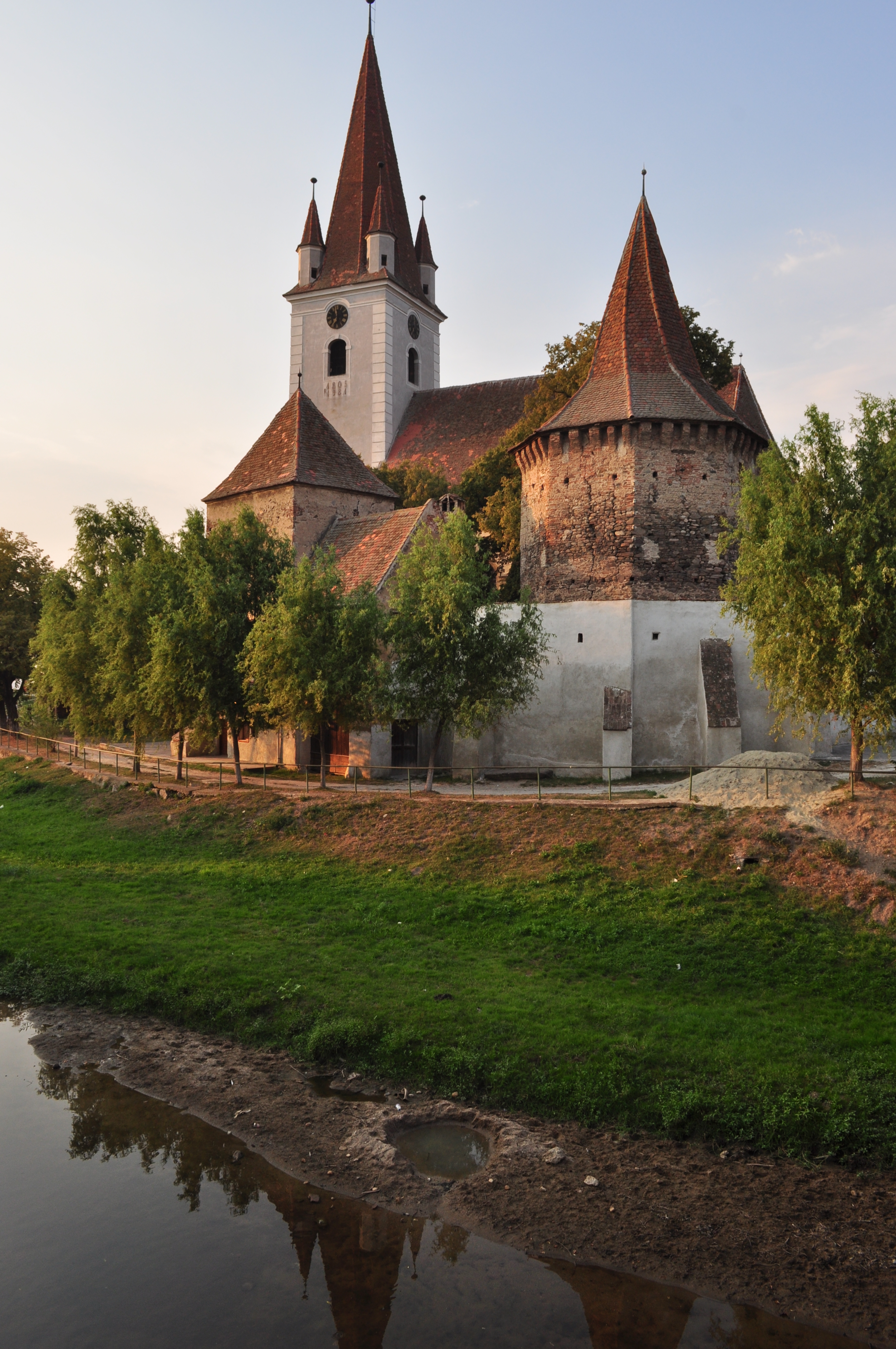
Fortified Saxon church at Cristian, Sibiu

In order to establish a zone of buffer states, Sigismund I of Hungary tried to draw the neighboring Orthodox rulers under his own suzerainty by granting them estates in his kingdom. For example, Stefan Lazarević of Serbia received Satu Mare, Baia Mare and Baia Sprie in modern Romania, and Mircea I of Wallachia was granted Făgăraș. Sigismund I was also the first monarch who recognized, in 1419, the legislative competence of the Estates in Transylvania. On his initiative, their assembly declared that in case of an Ottoman attack, every third nobleman and every tenth serf would take up arms. Indeed, from 1420 Ottoman attacks occurred on an annual basis. In this period many Saxon churches, and later the Székely churches of the Ciuc region, were fortified, which gave local architecture a distinctive appearance.

The increasing defense costs fell primarily on the serfs: the rent on the land was raised and extraordinary taxes were imposed. The first peasant revolt in the territory of modern Romania broke out due to the efforts taken by the bishop of Transylvania to collect the church taxes. Led by Anton Budai Nagy, the rebellious peasants, who called themselves "the commune of the rightful Hungarian and Romanian inhabitants of this part of Transylvania", established a fortified camp on the Bobâlna hill early in 1437. They fought two important battles against the noblemen; the first one, at Bobâlna, was won by the peasants, and the second one, near the Apatiu River, had no clear winner. The leaders of the noblemen, the Saxons and the Székelys, however, set up a "brotherly union" in order to join forces and crushed the peasants' resistance by the end of January 1438.

The Ottomans' attempt to conquer new territories led to a better organized policy against them. The temporary union of the Eastern and Western Churches proclaimed by the Council of Florence in 1439 also created a favorable background for the concentration of Christian forces. Christendom found its champion in John Hunyadi who gained a series of victories over the Ottomans after 1441. For instance, in 1442 he routed an Ottoman army that had been devastating Transylvania. Through his last victory over Mehmed II at the siege of Belgrade (in modern Serbia) in 1456, he saved the kingdom from Ottoman occupation for several decades. During the reign of his son, Matthias I of Hungary (1458–1490), the Ottomans launched only one serious attack against Transylvania in 1479 when they were defeated at Câmpul Pâinii.

Matthias I used his officials to assert royal prerogatives that had already fallen into disuse. The noblemen found it particularly irksome that the lucrum camarae, a tax from which they had been exempted was replaced with a new tax. In Transylvania, the "Three Nations" entered into a formal alliance against the king in 1467, but he quickly intervened and took the disorganized rebels by surprise.

By that time, the land once held in common by the Székely community had gradually become divided into smaller and smaller units; thus a vast number of the free warrior-peasants had to enter the service of their more prosperous fellow Székelys. This social stratification was formally recognized by a royal decree in 1473. Thereafter those who performed mounted military service were differentiated from those who fought as foot-soldiers; those who were unable to finance themselves even as foot-soldiers were legally reduced to servitude.

The prominence of the German element in the towns sometimes led to conflicts along ethnic lines. Thus the struggle for leadership in Cluj (now Cluj-Napoca) between Hungarians and Saxons only came to an end in 1458 by establishing a rule that municipal offices must be shared equally between the two groups. In 1486, Matthias I united all the Saxon districts in Transylvania in the "University of the Saxons" under the leadership of the elected mayor of Sibiu.

After Matthias I's death, the assembly of the Estates, called Diet, began to function as a regular organ of power. The peasantry suffered most from the rule of the Estates, for instance, by the limitation of their right to free movement. In 1514 thousands of peasants who had been summoned to Buda (now Budapest, in modern Hungary) to join the crusade proclaimed by Pope Leo X against the Ottomans turned the weapons against their masters. The rebels, led by the Székely George Dózsa, occupied several towns, such as Oradea and Șoimoș, but on July 15 John Szapolyai, the voivode defeated them at Timișoara. As a retaliation, the Diet decreed that peasants were to be tied to the land "perpetually".

The downfall of the Kingdom of Hungary was marked by the battle of Mohács (Hungary) where the royal army was annihilated by the Ottomans on August 29, 1526. Thereafter the noblemen's political factions engaged in conflict and elected two kings. One of them, John I Szapolyai (1526–1540) was supported by the lesser nobility, while Ferdinand I of Habsburg (1526–1564) was recognized mainly in the kingdom's western counties, but the Transylvanian Saxons also supported him. Seeking the assistance of the Ottomans, John I had to pay homage to the sultan at Mohács in 1529.

=== Wallachia ===
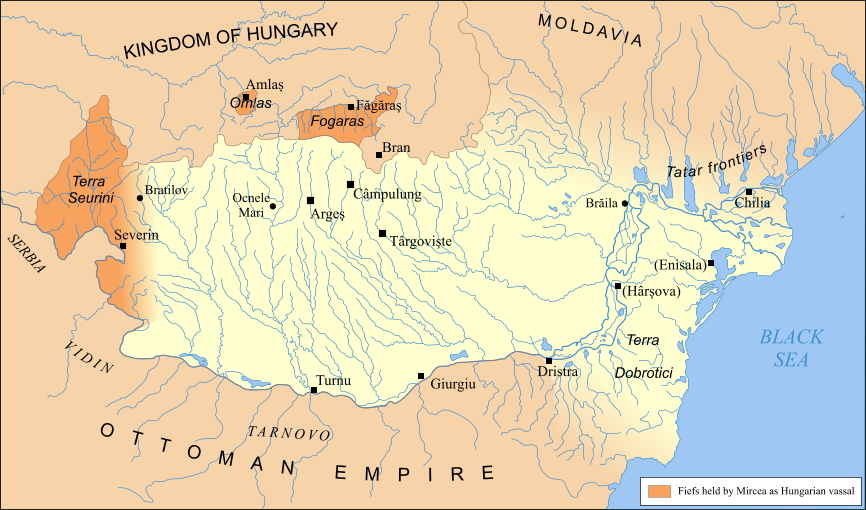
Wallachia (c. 1404)

After the battle of Nicopolis, the Ottomans occupied Bulgaria and could attack Wallachia more easily. Mircea I the Old, however, could reoccupy Dobruja in 1402 by taking advantage of the Ottomans' difficulties after their defeat by Timur Lenk in the battle of Ankara. He even intervened in the Ottoman civil war and supported the struggle of Musa and Mustafa against their brother, Mehmed I. After the two pretenders had been defeated, the Ottomans annexed again Dobruja and occupied Giurgiu, and Mircea I was forced to pay an annual tribute to the sultan. Under Mircea I iron mines were opened at Baia de Fier and copper mining began at Baia de Aramă. In addition, sulfur and amber were extracted in the region of Buzău.

After Mircea I's death, princes succeeded one another on the throne with devastating frequency. For instance, Michael I (1418–1420) was overthrown by his cousin, Dan II (1420–1431), and in the next decade the throne was occupied with frequent changes either by Dan II or by his cousin, Radu II the Bald (1421–1427), the former being supported by Sigismund I of Hungary and the latter by the Ottomans.

Alexander I Aldea (1431–1436) was the first Romanian ruler to be forced to render military service to the Ottomans. Two decades later, Vlad III the Impaler (1448, 1456–1462, 1476), notorious as the model for the Dracula legend, turned against the Ottoman Empire. He carried out a series of attacks across the Danube in the winter of 1461–1462. The response was a massive invasion led by Mehmed II who drove Vlad III from the throne and replaced him with his brother, Radu III the Fair (1462–1475). Due to the frequent military operations, the Wallachian Plain was heavily depopulated after the end of the 14th century. On the other hand, Wallachia received a steady flow of immigrants, mostly from the Balkans.

After 1462 Wallachia preserved its autonomy mainly through the intervention of Stephen the Great of Moldavia. At the end of the century, however, Radu IV the Great (1495–1508) became an obedient subject of the sultan and visited Istanbul annually to personally offer the tribute. Even so, he could only stay in power by collaborating with the powerful Craiovești family, strongly connected to the Ottomans by trading. In 1512 a member of this family, Neagoe (1512–1521) rose to throne, but he adopted the dynastic name of Basarab in order to legitimize his rule. He wrote the first original work of Romanian literature, titled Teachings, to his son, Teodosius on moral, political, and military questions.

Under Theodosius I (1521–1522) the Ottoman governor of Nicopolis take advantage of the internal fights among the boyar parties, and thus dominated the political life of Wallachia. Due to the imminent danger of annexation, the boyars grouped around Radu V of Afumați (1522–1529) who fought about 20 battles against the Ottomans. Finally, he was, in 1525, forced to accept Ottoman suzerainty and the rise of the tribute.

=== Moldavia ===
The Orthodox Metropolitan See of Moldavia was recognized by the Ecumenical Patriarch during the reign of Alexander I the Good (1400–1432). He reinforced Moldavia's traditional pro-Polish orientation and declared himself a vassal of Władysław II of Poland in 1406. Thenceforth, the Moldavian armies fought together with the Poles against the Teutonic Knights. The first Ottoman attack on Moldavia in 1420 was also repulsed by him. Alexander I's death was followed by a long period of political instability, characterized by frequent fights for the throne. For instance, the struggle of his sons, Iliaș I (1432–1442) and Stephen II (1433–1447) ended in 1435 by the division of the country.

Although cottage industries, both in boyar and peasant households, were still the main source of clothing, food and construction, specialized production, such as weaving and pottery, started to develop by the middle of the 15th century. The first oil wells went into production in 1440, but their oil was also only for household use. In Moldavia, Gypsy slaves were first mentioned in 1428 when Alexander I awarded 31 Gypsy families to the Bistrița Monastery. In time Gypsies became specialized in several crafts: for example, throughout the Middle Ages the working of iron was an occupation reserved almost exclusively for them.

Peter III Aaron (1451–1457) was the first prince who agreed to pay tribute to the Ottomans in 1456. He was ousted by his nephew, Stephen, with the support of Vlad the Impaler of Wallachia. Stephen III the Great was to be the most important medieval Romanian monarch who managed to uphold Moldavia's autonomy against Hungary, Poland and the Ottoman Empire.

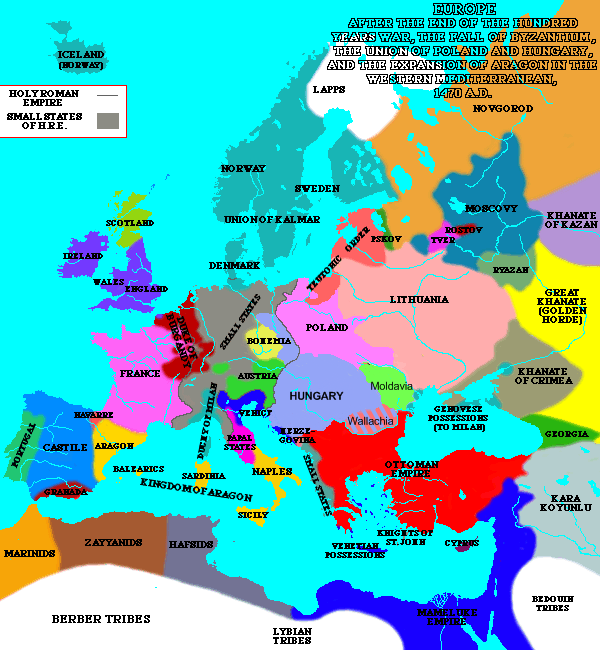
Europe around 1470

In the early years of his reign, he remained allied with Poland and the Ottoman Empire, and even joined the Ottomans in attacking Wallachia. He also supported the rebellion of 1467 of the Transylvanian Estates; therefore Matthias I of Hungary launched an expedition against Moldavia, but the royal army was defeated in the battle of Baia. He came to view the Ottoman Empire as his chief enemy in the 1470s, and in 1474 he refused to pay tribute. He soon received the ultimatum of Mehmed II who demanded the surrender of Chilia, a fortress recently captured from Wallachia. Upon Stephen III's refusal, a large Ottoman army was sent against Moldavia. He called on Pope Sixtus IV, pleading for a crusade. Although the pope acknowledged his merits, by naming him "the Athlete of Christ", no anti-Ottoman coalition materialized. Even without external military support, Stephen the Great led his troops to victory in the battle of Vaslui on January 10, 1475. Following the battle, he addressed a letter to the Christian princes, expressing the idea that the two Romanian principalities were the "gateway to the Christian world", and if they fell "all Christendom would be in danger".

He also recognized Matthias I of Hungary as his suzerain and received, in return, Ciceu and Cetatea de Baltă in Transylvania. The following year, however, he found himself alone when Mehmed II invaded Moldavia. The Moldavian army was defeated in the Battle of Valea Albă, but the Ottomans, suffering from a lack of provisions and an outbreak of the plague, were forced to retreat. Stephen the Great suffered the greatest setback of his reign in 1484 when the Ottomans captured Chilia and Cetatea Alba (now Bilhorod-Dnistrovskyi, Ukraine) on the Black Sea. Having tried unsuccessfully to regain the fortresses in 1485, he concluded a peace with the sultan and agreed to pay tribute to him.

He was succeeded by his son, Bogdan III the One-Eyed (1504–1517) whose reign was troubled by a long series of military conflicts with Poland and Wallachia. The good relations with Poland were reestablished under the reign of Stephen IV the Younger (1517–1527). His successor, Peter IV Rareș (1527–1538, 1541–1546) intervened in the struggle for the crown of the Kingdom of Hungary: on the order of the sultan, in 1529 he invaded the Székely Land and defeated the army of Ferdinand I's partisans.

== Ottoman suzerainty (1530–1594) ==
=== Establishment of Principality of Transylvania ===
After 1529, resistance to John I in Transylvania was broken in a series of small campaigns. For instance, the last Transylvanian magnate to side with Ferdinánd I, Stephen Majláth went over to John I in early 1532, and Sibiu was occupied in 1536. On February 24, 1538, a secret pact was signed in Oradea by the representatives of the two kings of Hungary. According to the treaty, both rulers were allowed to retain the territories which they then held, but the childless John I promised to recognize the Habsburgs' succession.

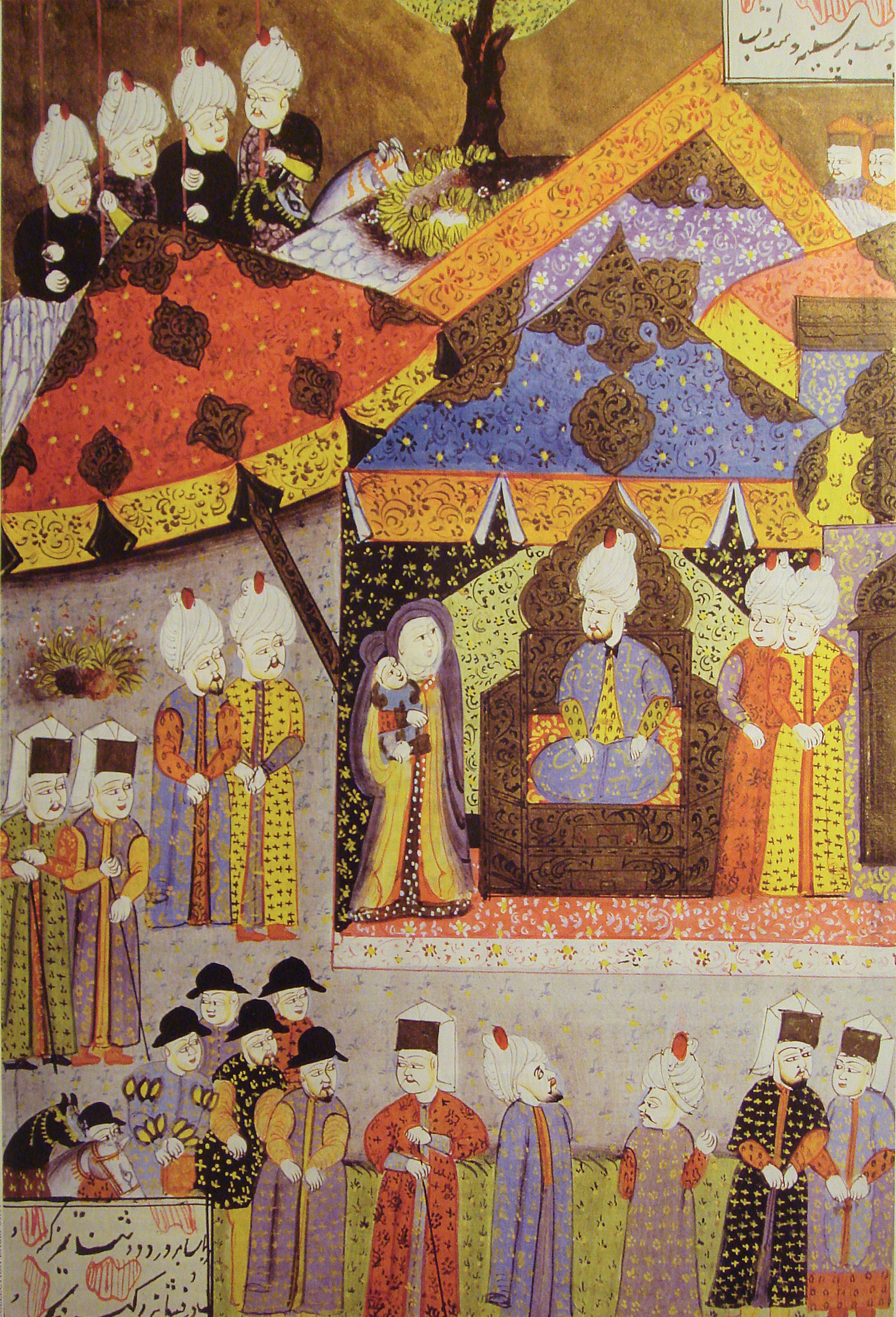
Suleiman I receiving Queen Isabella and her infant son at Buda (1541)

However, John I married a daughter of Sigismund I of Poland, Isabella, who in 1540 bore him a son. Already dying, the king took an oath from his barons to evade the treaty of Oradea, and his counselor, George Martinuzzi, had the infant John II Sigismund elected as king (1540–1571). Ferdinand I sent troops to take Buda, but they withdrew upon the advance of the Ottoman army. On August 29, 1541 Suleiman I summoned the Hungarian lords to his camp, and while the reception was taking place, his troops occupied the capital of the kingdom. At the same time the sultan assigned the territories of the kingdom east of the Tisa to Queen Isabella and her son in return for an annual tribute.

On October 18, the kingdom's eastern territories, including Transylvania, swore allegiance to the infant king at the Diet of Debrecen (Hungary). Thus a separate country started to emerge, although George Martinuzzi was still negotiating with Ferdinand I on the reunification of the kingdom. For this purpose, in 1551 Ferdinand I sent an army into Transylvania where he was recognized as sole ruler by the Diet. The Ottomans, however, occupied a great part of Banat in 1552, and neither could Ferdinand I consolidate his rule over the kingdom's eastern territories. Finally, the Diet, meeting in Sebeș on March 12, 1556, swore again allegiance to "the son of King John", thus the young king and his mother returned to Transylvania.

The 16th century also brought about major religious changes: the Saxons converted to Lutheranism, while most of the Hungarians converted to Calvinism or Unitarianism; only the Székelys remained more than the other "nations" Catholic. In 1568, the Transylvanian Diet at Torda decreed the free worship of these four "received denominations", but Orthodoxy still continued to be only tolerated. The Romanians' status worsened in this period. The Diets of 1554 and 1555 decided that a Catholic or Protestant peasant could not be accused of a crime except there were seven Catholic or Protestant witnesses against him, while an Orthodox peasant could be accused if there were three Catholic or Protestant or seven Orthodox witnesses. The Diet of 1559 also decreed that Romanians who had settled on lands abandoned by Catholic serfs were obliged to pay the tithe.

It (Transylvania) is inhabited by three nations – Székelys, Hungarians and Saxons. I should add the Romanians who – even though they easily equal the others in number – have no liberties, no nobility and no rights of their own, except for a small number living in the district of Hațeg, where it is believed that the capital of Decebalus lay, and who were made nobles during the time of John Hunyadi, a native of that place, because they always took part tirelessly in the battles against the Turks. All others are common people, serfs of the Hungarians and without settlements of their own, scattered everywhere, throughout the entire country, rarely settled in open places, most of them retired in the woods, leading an unfortunate life alongside their flocks.

— Antun Vrančić: On the Situation of Transylvania, Moldavia and Wallachia

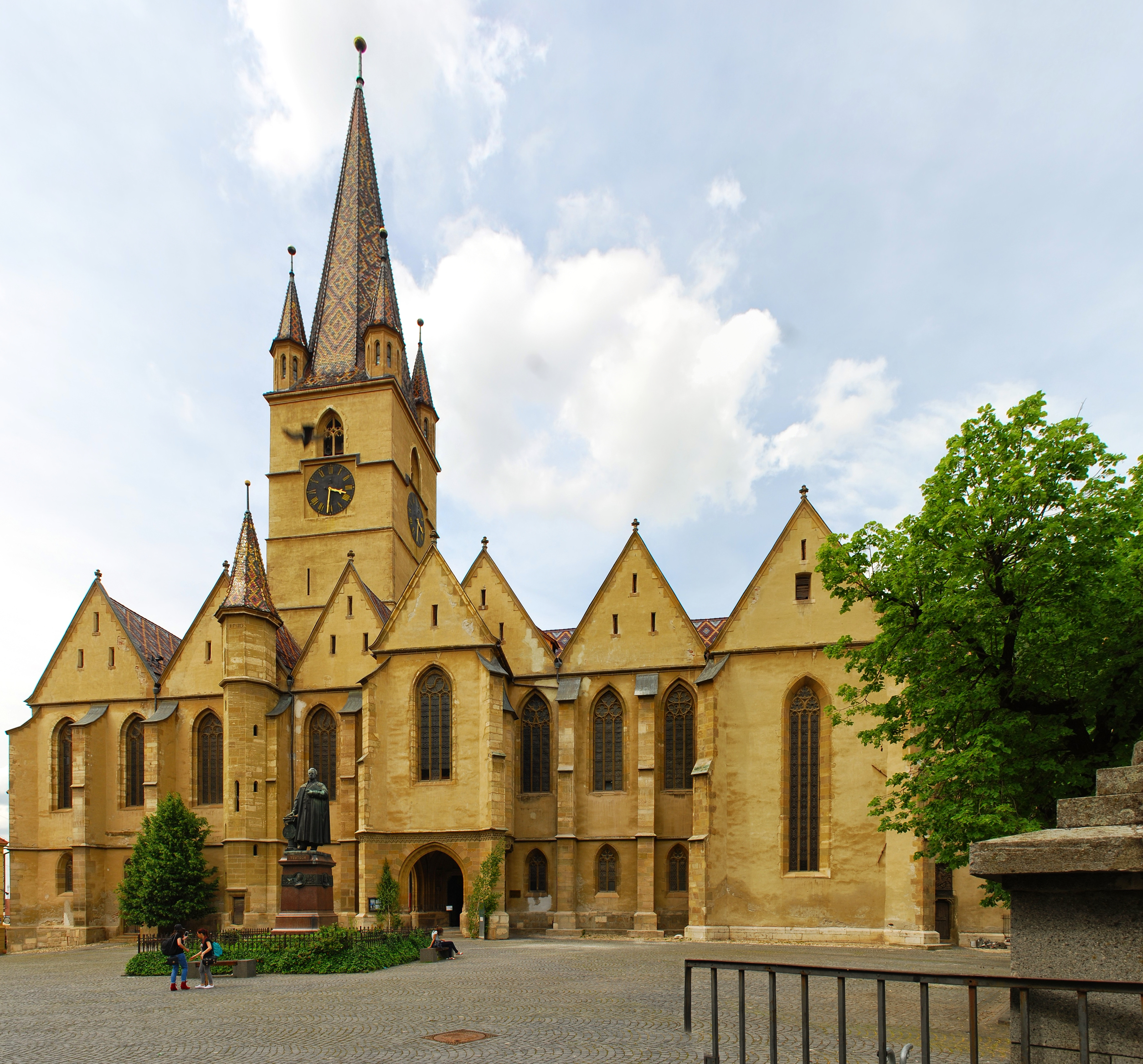
Evangelical Church in Sibiu

From the Székelys, continuing warfare demanded increased military service, and the royal administration imposed special taxes on them. Although the leaders of the Székely community were exempted from taxation in 1554, but all the foot soldiers continued to be taxed, resulting in a double burden of military and monetary obligations for them. In 1562 many Székelys took up arms against John II Sigismund, but they were defeated. The Saxon towns continued to develop even in the years of upheaval. Their population, however, increased slowly, mainly as a consequence of the Saxons' traditional desire for segregation: even Hungarian craftsmen and merchants were prohibited from settling in their towns.

In the Treaty of Speyer of August 16, 1570, John II Sigismund acknowledged his rival, Maximilian I (1564–1576) as the lawful king of Hungary and adopted the title of "prince of Transylvania and parts of the Kingdom of Hungary". The treaty also marked out the borders of the new principality, which included not only the historical province of Transylvania, but also some neighboring counties, such as Bihor and Maramureș, thenceforward collectively known as Partium. The death of John II Sigismund in 1571 threatened to throw the country again into the hands of the Habsburgs whose officers supported the Unitarian Gáspár Bekes. Now the sultan appointed Stephen Báthory, a Catholic politician, voivode.

The decisive battle between the two candidates was won by Stephen Báthory at Sânpaul on July 8, 1575. In the same year, he was elected king of Poland, thus a personal union was formed between the two countries that lasted until his death in 1586. He left the administration of the principality first to his brother, Christopher Báthory (1575–1581), and then to his brother's minor son, Sigismund Báthory (1581–1602), bestowing on them the title of voivode, while he himself took the title of prince.

In February, 1594 Sigismund Báthory announced that his country would join the anti-Ottoman alliance formed by the Holy Roman Emperor, Rudolf II, Philip II of Spain and many smaller Italian and German states. Although the Estates twice refused to endorse the declaration of war, Transylvania joined the alliance on January 28, 1595 after the leaders of the opposition had been executed on the order of the monarch. In return Rudolph II recognized Sigismund's title of prince.

=== Wallachia ===
The short and unworthy reigns of Radu V's successors only increased the crisis of Wallachia. Starting with Mircea the Shepherd (1545–1559), the first prince placed on the throne by the sultan, the crown became negotiable, according to the largest tribute offered. Even Michael the Brave who in time would turn against the Ottomans ascended the throne with the support of some people who had influence with the Sublime Porte, among them Sir Edward Barton, the English ambassador to Istanbul.

He soon embarked upon a program to strengthen the central authority by replacing the members of the sfatul domnesc, an advisory body consisting of boyars, with dregători, that is officials personally loyal to him. Michael the Brave also adopted an anti-Ottoman policy, and upon his initiative Sigismund Báthory of Transylvania and Aaron the Tyrant of Moldavia (1591–1595) signed a treaty to form an anti-Ottoman alliance. The rebellion started by the massacre of all the Ottomans in Wallachia on November 13, 1594.

=== Moldavia ===
In 1531 Peter IV Rareș invaded Poland in order to reoccupy the Pocuția region (in modern Ukraine), but his army was defeated. Now he concluded a secret treaty with Ferdinand I of Hungary, but soon had to seek refugee in Transylvania when Suleiman I led an army against him. This was the first occasion when a prince, Stephen V Lăcustă (1538–1540) was appointed by the sultan. At the same time, the sultan occupied Brăila and Tighina (now in Moldova), and the Budjak region (now in Ukraine). Peter IV Rareș recovered his throne in exchange for a large sum of money in 1541. His death was followed by a period characterized by fights between pretenders to the throne and among the boyar parties.

The idea of anti-Ottoman struggle was revived by John III the Terrible (1572–1574) who refused to pay the tribute to the sultan. As a result, Ottoman and Wallachian troops invaded Moldavia, but they were defeated by John III in a surprise attack near Jiliște. Now the sultan sent a large army against Moldavia, and the prince was captured and quartered. Next Aaron the Tyrant joined the anti-Ottoman coalition of Transylvania and Wallachia, and started a rebellion on November 13, 1594, simultaneously with Michael the Brave of Wallachia.

The 16th century was characterized by the flourishing of ecclesiastical mural painting whose technique have remained a secret until today. For example, the interior and exterior frescoes of the Voroneț Monastery represent this "Moldavian style".

== Age of Michael the Brave (1595–1601) ==
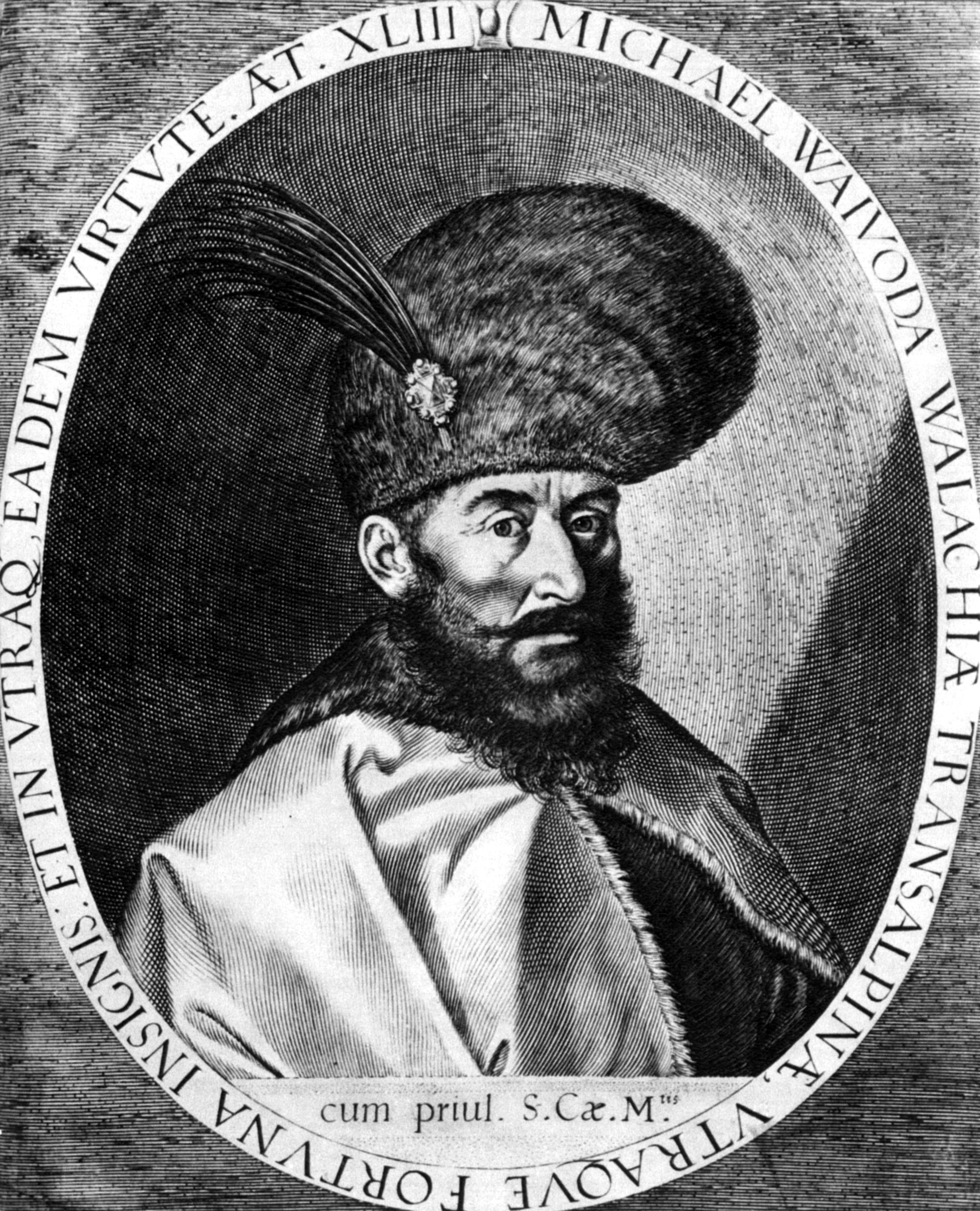
Michael the Brave

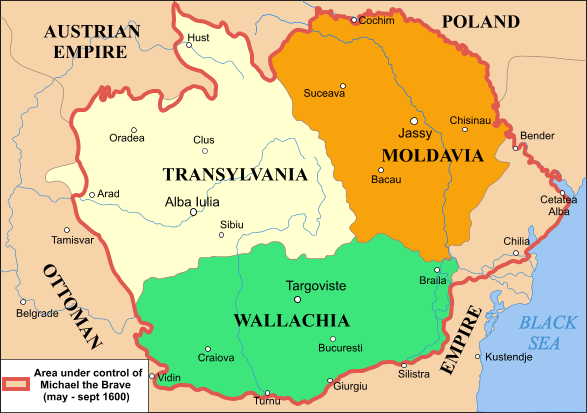
Moldavia, Transylvania and Wallachia in 1600

Following their coordinated uprising, Michael the Brave attacked Ottoman strongholds along the Danube and recovered Giurgiu and Brăila, while Aaron the Tyrant seized Ismail (now in Ukraine). In response, the sultan ordered the Grand Vizier, Sinan Pasha to invade Wallachia. The two princes needed the support of Sigismund Báthory who took advantage of the situation to make himself suzerain of Wallachia and Moldavia. When Aaron the Tyrant refused Sigismund Báthory's conditions, he was replaced by the latter's protégé, Ștefan Răzvan (1595) on the throne.

According to the treaty signed by Michael the Brave on May 20, 1595 in Alba Iulia, Sigismund Báthory became the ruler of the three principalities and adopted the title of "prince of Transylvania, Moldavia and Transalpine Wallachia". The treaty stipulated, that the taxes would be established in Wallachia by the Transylvanian Diet, together with a council of 12 Wallachian boyars. Around that time, the peasants were bound to the land both in Wallachia and Moldavia.

Ottoman troops entered Wallachia in the summer, but they were defeated by Michael the Brave at Călugăreni and by the united armies of the three principalities at Giurgiu. In the meantime, however, the Poles had invaded Moldavia and replaced Ștefan Răzvan by Ieremia Movilă (1595–1606). In June 1598 Michael the Brave recognized the suzerainty of Emperor Rudolph II, who had promised to grant subsidies to him to finance his mercenaries.

On March 30, 1599 Sigismund Báthory abdicated the throne in favor of his cousin, Andrew Báthory (1599). The new prince was loyal to the Poles and promptly demanded that Michael the Brave accept his suzerainty. The latter secured the emperor's approval for an invasion of Transylvania and attacked the principality where the Székelys also joined him. He defeated his opponent at Șelimbăr on October 28, 1599 and entered Alba Iulia. Here the Diet recognized him as imperial governor. He respected the traditional organization of Transylvania, and even crushed a revolt of the Romanian peasants, but forced the Diet to relieve the Orthodox priests of feudal obligations. In the spring of 1600, he invaded Moldavia in the name of the emperor and established control over it. In July he even proclaimed himself "prince of Wallachia, Transylvania, and all of Moldavia" in Iași, thus bringing about the union of the three principalities.

However, the Hungarian noblemen, dissatisfied with the disorder, rebelled against his rule, and defeated him at Mirăslău on September 18, 1600. At the same time, the Poles invaded Moldavia and restored Ieremia Movilă to the throne; then they entered Wallachia, where Simion Movilă defeated Michael the Brave at Buzău. In this moment of crisis, Michael the Brave left for Prague to appeal to the emperor for support. He returned to Transylvania in July 1601 at the head of an imperial army. Cooperating with the imperial general, Giorgio Basta, he defeated the Transylvanian troops at Guruslău on August 3, but on August 19 he was assassinated on the order of his former ally, Giorgio Basta.

== After the first union ==
After Michael the Brave's death, Transylvania was ruled by an imperial military commission, but under Stephen Bocskay (1604–1606) the principality voluntarily accepted Ottoman suzerainty. In the next decades, the princes of Transylvania, among them Gabriel Bethlen (1613–1629), made several unsuccessful attempts to unify Transylvania, Wallachia and Moldavia.

Wallachia and Moldavia fell back under the control of the Ottoman Empire after Michael the Brave's death. Radu Mihnea, prince of Wallachia (1611–1616, 1623–1626) and of Moldavia (1616–1623), was the first ruler to appoint Greeks from the Phanar district of Istanbul to high government posts. This started a trend that ultimately led to the so-called "Phanariot period" in Romania's history.

== See also ==
- Banat in the Middle Ages
- List of Wallachian rulers (up to 1859)
- List of Moldavian rulers (up to 1859)
- List of Transylvanian rulers (up to 1918)

== Footnotes ==
Preceded by Early Middle Ages	History of Romania	Succeeded by Early Modern Times
