= Câlniștea =

- Location within Romania

Location
- Country: Romania
- Counties: Teleorman, Giurgiu

Physical characteristics
- Source
  - coordinates: 44°17′34″N 25°20′40″E
  - elevation: 117 m (384 ft)
- Mouth: Neajlov
  - location: Călugăreni
  - coordinates: 44°10′01″N 25°59′28″E
- Length: 112 km (70 mi)
- Basin size: 1,748 km^{2} (675 sq mi)

Basin features
- Progression: Neajlov→ Argeș→ Danube→ Black Sea

The Câlniștea is a right tributary of the river Neajlov in Romania. It discharges into the Neajlov in Călugăreni. Its length is 112 km (70 mi) and its basin size is 1,748 km^{2} (675 sq mi). It flows through the villages Botoroaga, Târnava, Tunari, Drăgănești-Vlașca, Bujoreni, Răsuceni, Prunaru, Carapancea, Naipu, Cămineasca, Schitu, Mirău, Stoenești, Ianculești, Hulubești, Uzunu and Călugăreni.

== Tributaries ==
The following rivers are tributaries to the river Câlniștea:

- Left: Mutu, Câlniștea Mică, Cenușarul, Letca, Râiosul, Glavacioc
- Right: Slătioarele, Valea Albă, Valea lui Damian, Valea Porumbenilor, Ismar, Râcu, Iordana
