= Valea Porumbenilor =

Valea Porumbenilor Trestenic
- Location within Romania

Location
- Country: Romania
- Counties: Giurgiu County
- Villages: Tomulești, Toporu, Cucuruzu

Physical characteristics
- Source
  - coordinates: 43°56′58″N 25°40′35″E
  - elevation: 87 m (285 ft)
- Mouth: Câlniștea
  - coordinates: 44°07′35″N 25°42′49″E
  - elevation: 69 m (226 ft)
- Length: 24 km (15 mi)
- Basin size: 166 km^{2} (64 sq mi)

Basin features
- Progression: Câlniștea→ Neajlov→ Argeș→ Danube→ Black Sea
- Tributaries
  - right: Siliștea

The Valea Porumbenilor (also: Trestenic) is a right tributary of the river Câlniștea in Romania. It discharges into the Câlniștea near Naipu. Its length is 24 km (15 mi) and its basin size is 166 km^{2} (64 sq mi).
