= Valea lui Damian =

- Location within Romania

Location
- Country: Romania
- Counties: Giurgiu County
- Villages: Satu Nou

Physical characteristics
- Source
  - coordinates: 44°01′30″N 25°36′36″E
  - elevation: 82 m (269 ft)
- Mouth: Câlniștea
  - location: Lake Chița, Răsuceni
  - coordinates: 44°05′25″N 25°40′31″E
  - elevation: 71 m (233 ft)
- Length: 11 km (6.8 mi)
- Basin size: 51 km^{2} (20 sq mi)

Basin features
- Progression: Câlniștea→ Neajlov→ Argeș→ Danube→ Black Sea

The Valea lui Damian is a right tributary of the river Câlniștea in Romania. It flows into the Câlniștea in Răsuceni. Its length is 11 km (6.8 mi) and its basin size is 51 km^{2} (20 sq mi).
