= Ianculești =

Ianculeşti may refer to several villages in Romania:

- Ianculeşti, a village in Șuici Commune, Argeș County
- Ianculeşti, a village in Stoeneşti Commune, Giurgiu County
- Ianculeşti, a village in the town of Carei, Satu Mare County
