= Cenușarul =

- Location within Romania

Location
- Country: Romania
- Counties: Teleorman County
- Villages: Valea Cireșului, Târnava

Physical characteristics
- Source
  - coordinates: 44°12′16″N 25°31′59″E
  - elevation: 92 m (302 ft)
- Mouth: Câlniștea
  - location: Târnava
  - coordinates: 44°08′51″N 25°33′51″E
  - elevation: 74 m (243 ft)
- Length: 10 km (6.2 mi)
- Basin size: 37 km^{2} (14 sq mi)

Basin features
- Progression: Câlniștea→ Neajlov→ Argeș→ Danube→ Black Sea

The Cenușarul is a left tributary of the river Câlniștea in Romania. It flows into the Câlniștea in Târnava. Its length is 10 km (6.2 mi) and its basin size is 37 km^{2} (14 sq mi).
