= Suhat (Câlniștea) =

- Location within Romania

Location
- Country: Romania
- Counties: Teleorman County
- Villages: Comoara

Physical characteristics
- Mouth: Valea Albă
  - coordinates: 44.0698°N 25.5831°E
  - elevation: 74 m (243 ft)
- Length: 18 km (11 mi)
- Basin size: 103 km^{2} (40 sq mi)

Basin features
- Progression: Valea Albă→ Câlniștea→ Neajlov→ Argeș→ Danube→ Black Sea
- Tributaries
  - right: Manița

The Suhat is a right tributary of the river Valea Albă in Romania. It discharges into the Valea Albă near Drăgănești-Vlașca. Its length is 18 km (11 mi) and its basin size is 103 km^{2} (40 sq mi).
