= Câlniștea Mică =

- Location within Romania

Location
- Country: Romania
- Counties: Teleorman County
- Villages: Moșteni

Physical characteristics
- Mouth: Câlniștea
  - location: Botoroaga
  - coordinates: 44°09′41″N 25°31′29″E
  - elevation: 85 m (279 ft)
- Length: 15 km (9.3 mi)
- Basin size: 40 km^{2} (15 sq mi)

Basin features
- Progression: Câlniștea→ Neajlov→ Argeș→ Danube→ Black Sea
- River code: X.1.23.11.1

The Câlniștea Mică is a left tributary of the river Câlniștea in Romania. It flows into the Câlniștea near Botoroaga. Its length is 15 km (9.3 mi) and its basin size is 40 km^{2} (15 sq mi).
