= Kerc =

Kerc may refer to:

- the Crimean city Kerch (Ancient Bosporus)
- the Hungarian name for Cârța, Sibiu, Romania
