= Râiosu River =

Râiosu River may refer to:

- Râiosu, a tributary of the Buda in Argeș County
- Râiosul, a tributary of the Câlniștea in Giurgiu County
