= Crucea de Piatră =

Crucea de Piatră may refer to:

- Crucea de Piatră, a red-light district in interbellum Bucharest
- Crucea de Piatră, a village in Călugăreni, Giurgiu
