= Ileana River =

Ileana River may refer to the following rivers in Romania:

- Ileana, a tributary of the Bahlui in Iași County
- Ileana, another name for the Râiosu River (Câlniștea), a tributary of the Câlniștea in Giurgiu County
