= Cârța Monastery =

Former Cistercian monastery in Țara Făgărașului, Transylvania, Romania

Coordinates: 45°47′04″N 24°34′04″E

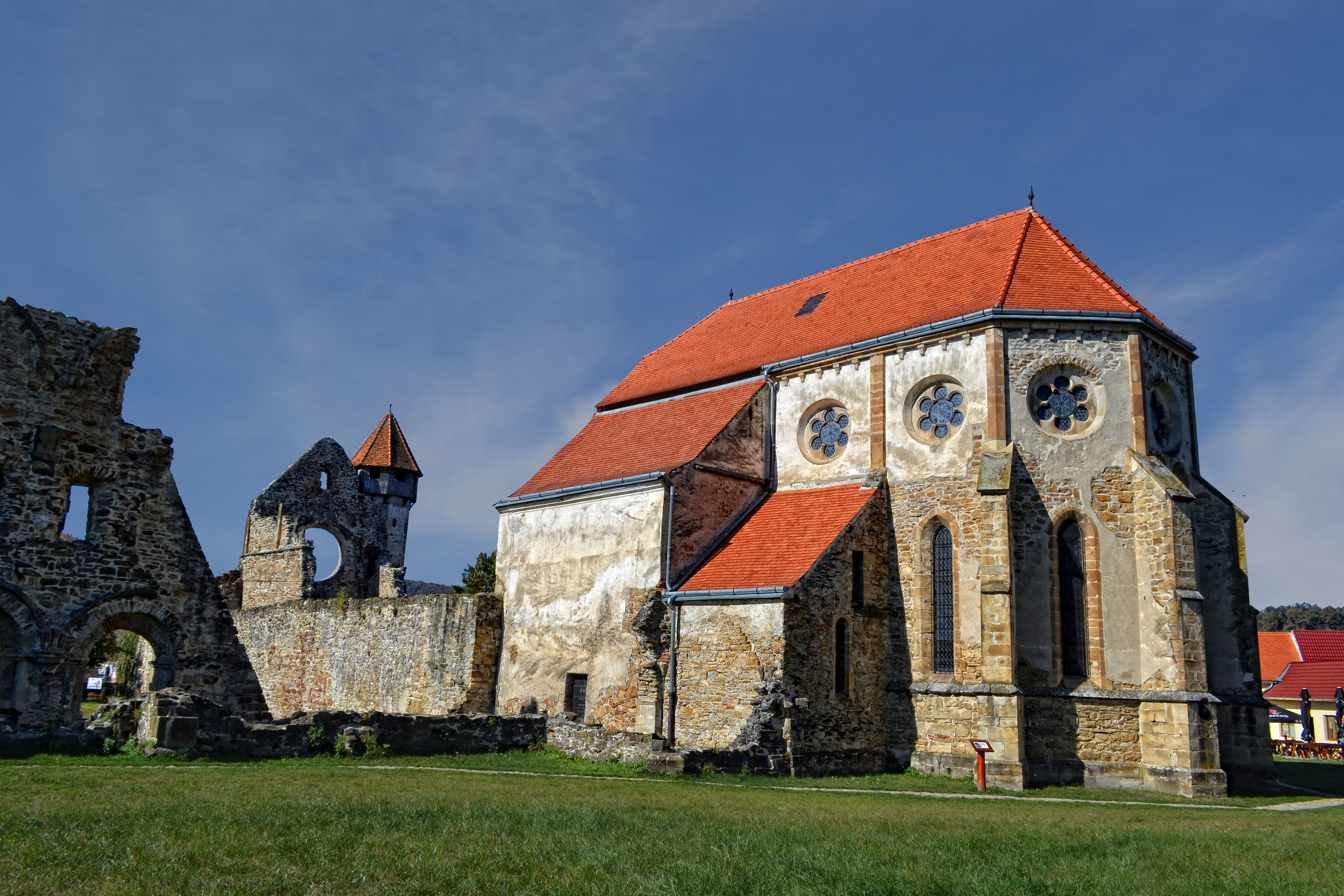
Mănăstirea Cârța

The Cârța Monastery (Romanian: [ˈkɨrtsa]) is a former Cistercian (Benedictine) monastery in the Țara Făgărașului region in southern Transylvania in Romania, currently an Evangelical Lutheran church belonging to the local Saxon community. It lies on the left bank of the Olt River, between the cities of Sibiu and Făgăraș, close to the villages of Cârța (German Kerz, Hungarian: Kerc) and Cârțișoara (German: Kleinkerz). The monastery was probably founded in 1202–1206 by monks from Igriș Abbey (daughter house of Pontigny Abbey), and was disbanded in 1494, when the apostolic legate Ursus of Ursinis ratified Cârța Abbey's attachment to the Provostship nullius of Sibiu. The Cistercian monastery introduced and helped develop French Gothic art in the region.

== History of the monastery ==
The exact founding date of the Cârța Monastery (Latin: monasterium beatae Mariae virginis in Candelis de Kerch) is unknown. A document from Konstanz, dated 17 April 1418, issued by Sigismund, King of Hungary states vaguely that the monastery was founded, built, and awarded rights and privileges by his predecessors. The statute of royal establishment is also pointed out in the act disbanding the monastery 27 February 1474, and was made ex auctoritate juris patronatus regii Matthias Corvinus, King of Hungary. Cistercian documents from the 13th till 15th century gathered and analyzed by Leopold Janauschek mention the founding year of the monastery as being somewhere around 1202–1203.

The best approximation of the monastery's date of foundation can be obtained from a document issued by the Arpadian royal chancellery in 1223. This document states that the territory on which the monastery was built – delimited by the Olt River at the north side and its tributaries the Arpaș River at the east, the Cârțișoara River at the west, and the Făgăraș Mountains at the south – was awarded by magister Gocelinus, for the blessing of his soul, through the Transylvanian voivode Benedict (pro remedio animae nostre per fidelem ac dilectum nostrum Benedictum tunc temporis vaivodam assignari facientes). It is known that Benedict was Voivode of Transylvania between 1202–1206 and 1208–1209. This means that the founding date must fall between 1202 and 1209. An additional document, the General Chapter of the Cistercian Order from 1206, further narrows the date of founding. This document mentions the presence of a Cistercian monk from Transylvania, most probably from Cârța (abbas ultra Sylvas in Hungaria, filius abbatis de Egris), at the Cîteaux Abbey, in Burgundy, the main abbey of the Cistercian order.

Summing up this historical data, the date of the monastery's founding by the cistercians monks can be established as occurring between 1198 and 1208. The colonising convent was the mother abbey in Igriș (Latin Egris, Hungarian Egres), in the Banat plain, today located in Timiș County, Romania. Filiation reports between the two monasteries can be dated from 1206, 1368, and 1430.

== History of the surviving structure ==
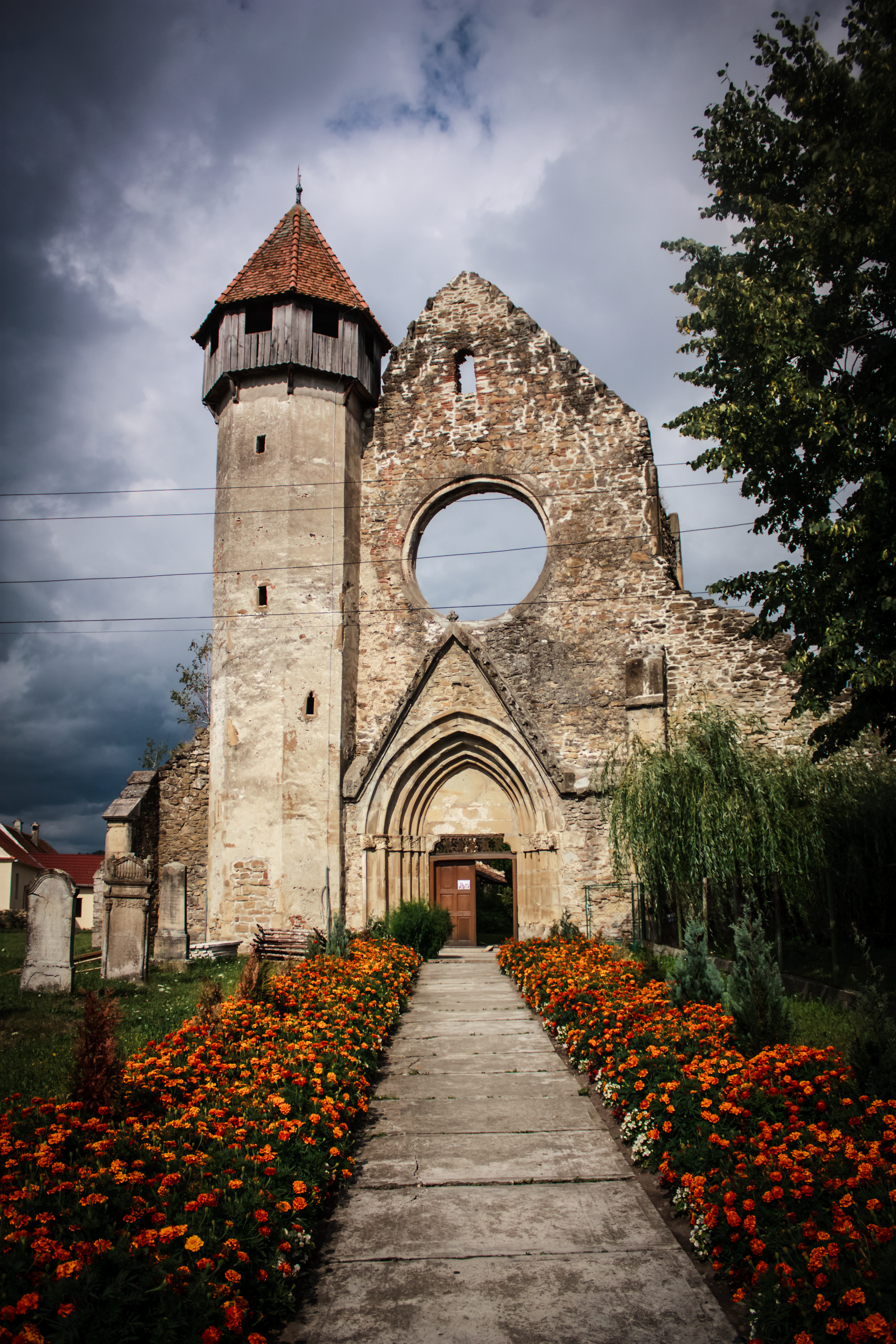
Tower of Cârța Monastery

The first buildings of the monastery were built, according to Cistercian customs, using perishable materials, most probably wood. These can be dated relatively confidently as having been built in the founding period (1205–1206). A few years later, approximately 1210–1215, a stone chapel, the oratorium, was built close to the original wood buildings. The foundations of this chapel of small dimension (around 8–10 metres) and massive walls, were rediscovered in the spring of 1927, by the Transylvanian Saxon art historian and archeologist Victor Roth. Also, subsequent researches were carried out in the period 1983-1985 to better study these remains.

The construction of the main stone edifice started a little bit later, most probably between 1220 and 1230. The construction occurred in two stages, separated by the Great Mongol invasion of 1241. In the first stage of construction, the main elements are of Romanesque influence. The general plan was traced and the walls were erected up to a height of about 3–4 metres. In 1260, the works were restarted under a new architect trained in the mature Gothic architecture, and with the help of a new masons' workshop. During this period, the old stone oratorium was dismantled and on its foundations was built a part of the north wing of the transept and a part of the choir with the polygonal apse. At around 1300, the church and the east wing of the Cârța Monastery were already finished and the works on the south side will continue for about two decades.

== Possessions of the monastery ==
A document issued on 29 January 1322 by the king Charles I of Hungary states that ten villages were in the possession of the Cistercian monastery of Cârța: Cârța (Kerch), Criț (Cruz), Meșendorf (Messendorf), Cloașterf (villa Nicholai), Apoș (villa Abbatis), Cisnădioara (monte sancti Michaelis), Feldioara (Feldwar), Colun (Colonia), Glâmboaca (Honrabah) and Cârța Românească (Kercz Olachorum) which correspond to the area between present day cities of Sibiu and Brașov and the Târnava Mare River valley.

In the second half of the 13th century, in its vicinity, on the right bank of the Olt river, the village of Cârța (German: Kerz) was founded and also on the Hârtibaciu River valley, close to Agnita, it founded the village of Apoș (German: Abtsdorf, or "the Monk's Village"). Both villages were populated with German colonists (Transylvanian Saxons) and later in the 13th and 14th centuries on the Sighișoara seat, it founded the villages of Criț (German: Deutsch-Kreuz; Hungarian: Szászkeresztúr), Meșendorf (German: Meschendorf; Hungarian: Mese) and Cloașterf (German: Klosterdorf; Hungarian: Miklóstelke), and also the villages Colun (German: Kolun; Hungarian: Kellen), Glâmboaca (German: Hühnerbach; Hungarian: Glimboka) and Feldioara (German: Marienburg; Hungarian Földvár) situated on the right bank of the Olt River between Sibiu and Brașov.
