= Rodica Popescu Bitănescu =

Romanian actress

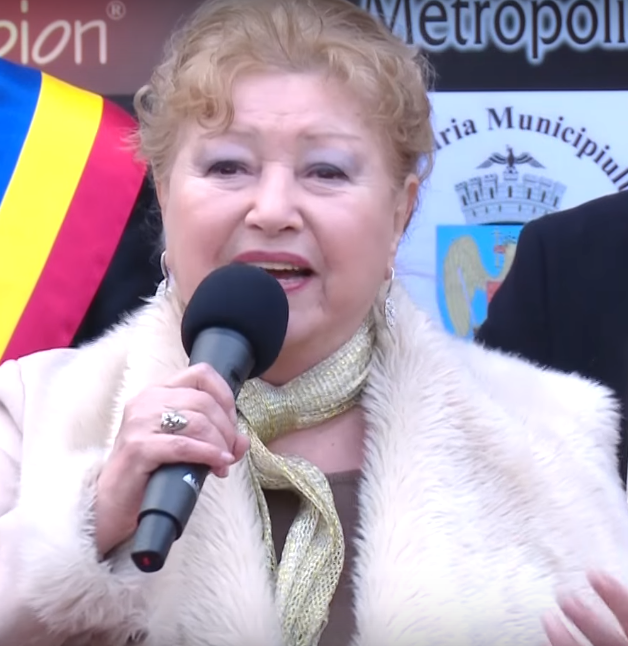
Rodica Popescu Bitănescu in 2016

Mihaela Rodica Popescu Bitănescu (Romanian pronunciation: [roˈdika poˈpesku bitəˈnesku]; born 5 August 1938) is a Romanian actress.

She was born in Răsuceni, a village in Vlașca County (now in Giurgiu County). In 1960, she graduated from the I.L. Caragiale Institute of Theatre and Film Arts (IATC). Currently, she works at the National Theatre Bucharest. In 2002, she was awarded the National Order of Faithful Service, knight rank.

== Filmography ==
- Ministerul comediei (1999)
- Cu materialul clientului (1997)
- Harababura (1991)
- Secretul lui Nemesis (1987)
- Cucoana Chirița (1987)
- Aripi de zăpadă (1985)
- Căsătorie cu repetiție (1985)
- Colierul de turcoaze (1985)
- Sosesc păsările călătoare (1985)
- Femeia din Ursa Mare (1982)
- Am o idee!... (1981)
- Dumbrava minunată (1980)
- Premiul întîi (1979)
- Ciocolată cu alune (1979)
- Eu, tu, și... Ovidiu (1978)
- Iarba verde de acasă (1977)
- Avocatul (1976) (TV)
- Patima (1975)
- Tăticul (1974) (TV)
- Originea și evoluția vehiculelor (1973)
