= Drăgănești-Vlașca =

- Commune
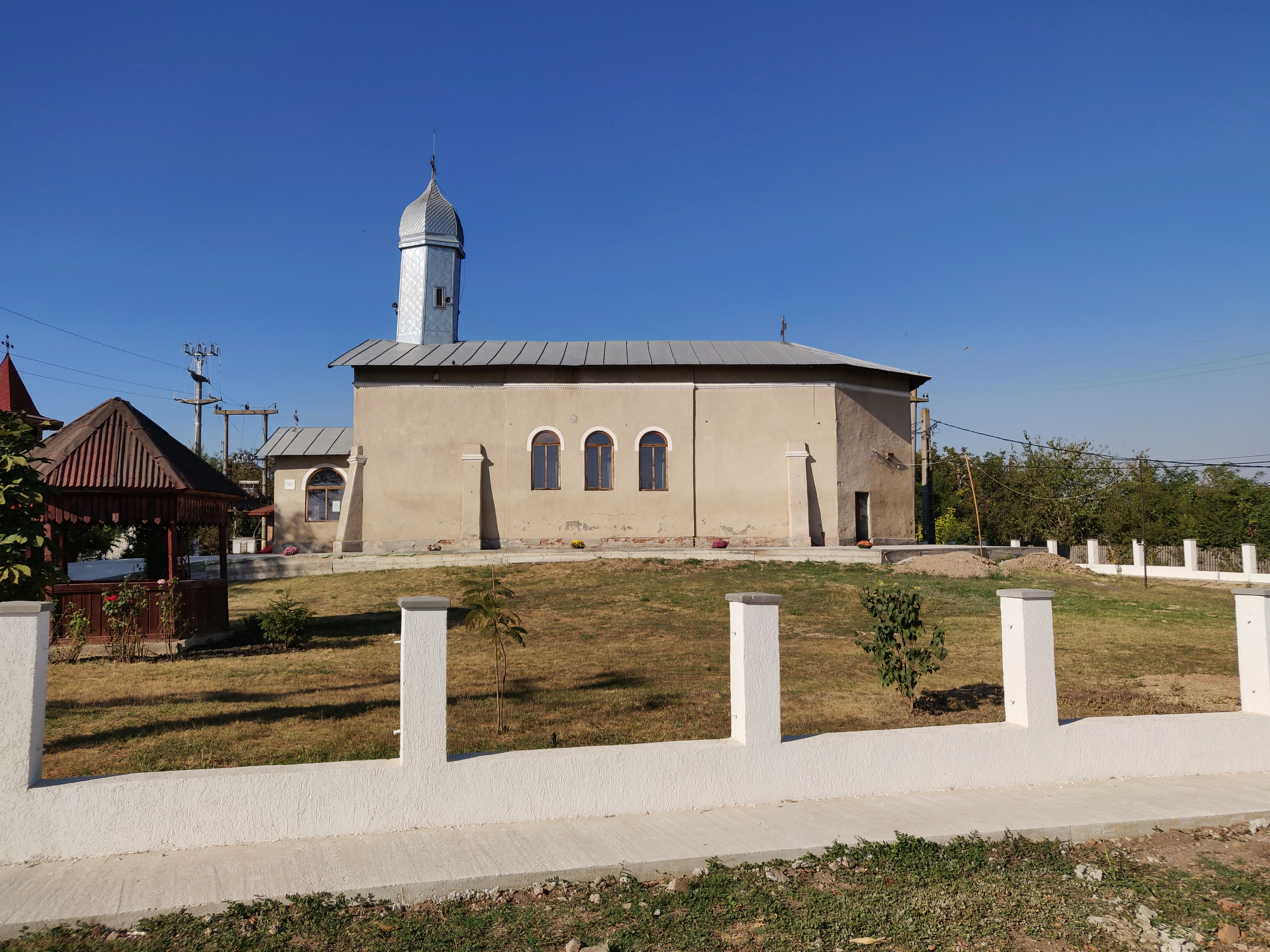
- Saint Nicholas Church in Drăgănești-Vlașca

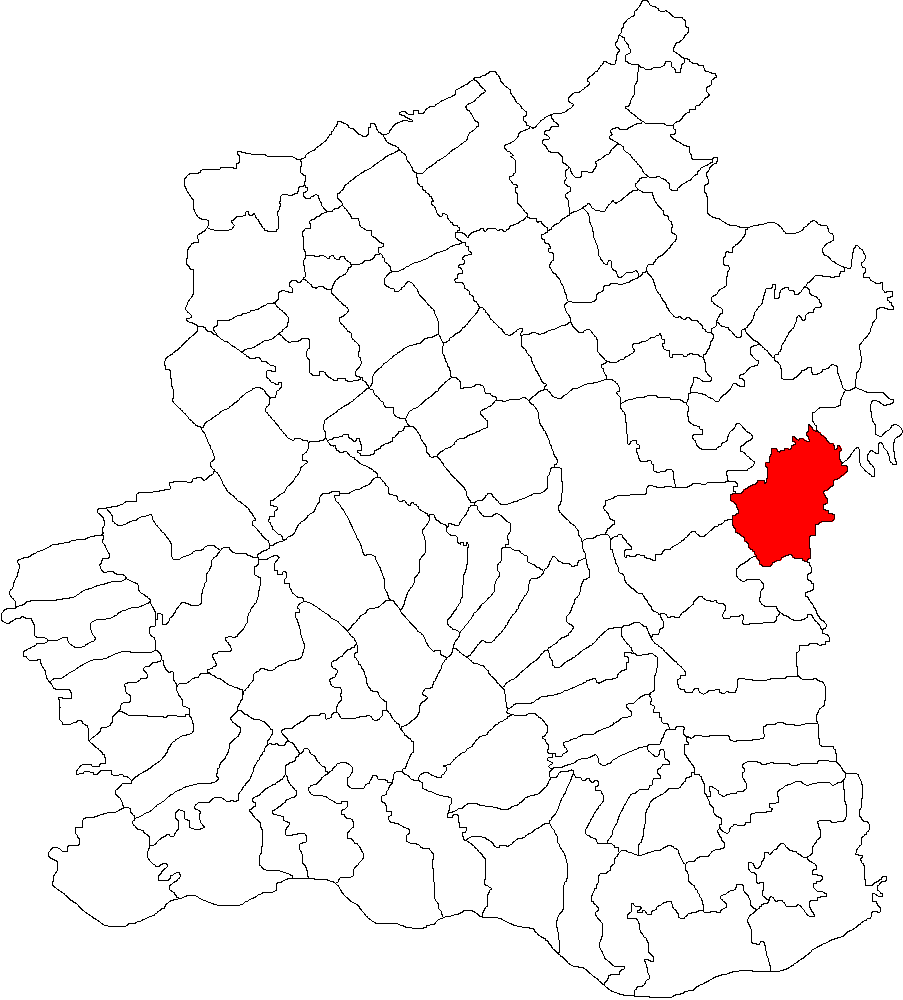
- Location in Teleorman County

- Location in Romania
- Coordinates: 44°06′N 25°36′E
- Country: Romania
- County: Teleorman
- Subdivisions: Comoara, Drăgănești-Vlașca, Văceni

Government
  - Mayor (2024–2028): Pena Dorin-Florentin (PSD)
- Area: 103.25 km^{2} (39.87 sq mi)
- Elevation: 76 m (249 ft)
- Population (2021-12-01): 3,698
  - Density: 35.82/km^{2} (92.76/sq mi)
- Time zone: UTC+02:00 (EET)
  - Summer (DST): UTC+03:00 (EEST)
- Postal code: 147135
- Area code: +(40) 247
- Vehicle reg.: TR
- Website: www.draganestivlasca.ro

Drăgănești-Vlașca (Romanian pronunciation: [drəɡəˈneʃtʲ ˈvlaʃka]) is a commune in Teleorman County, Muntenia, Romania. It is composed of three villages: Comoara, Drăgănești-Vlașca, and Văceni.

The commune is situated in the central part of the Wallachian Plain, at an altitude of 76 m (249 ft), on the banks of the river Câlniștea and its right tributary, the Valea Albă, as well as the latter's tributary, the Suhat. It is located in the eastern part of Teleorman County, 26 km (16 mi) northeast of the county seat, Alexandria, on the border with Giurgiu County. Drăgănești-Vlașca is crossed by national road DN6 (part of European route E70), which connects Bucharest, 60 km (37 mi) to the northeast, to the western part of the country.

== Natives ==
- Petre Becheru (born 1960), weightlifter
- Corneliu Călugăreanu (1930–2011), basketball player
- Marius Coporan (born 1975), footballer
- Sofia Corban (born 1956), rower
