= Valea Albă (Câlniștea) =

- Location within Romania

Location
- Country: Romania
- Counties: Teleorman County
- Villages: Ludăneasca

Physical characteristics
- Source
  - coordinates: 44°08′55″N 25°26′36″E
  - elevation: 93 m (305 ft)
- Mouth: Câlniștea
  - location: Drăgănești-Vlașca
  - coordinates: 44°05′50″N 25°36′17″E
  - elevation: 69 m (226 ft)
- Length: 13 km (8.1 mi)
- Basin size: 163 km^{2} (63 sq mi)

Basin features
- Progression: Câlniștea→ Neajlov→ Argeș→ Danube→ Black Sea
- Tributaries
  - left: Puțul Buții, Suhat

The Valea Albă is a right tributary of the river Câlniștea in Romania. It discharges into the Câlniștea in Drăgănești-Vlașca. Its length is 13 km (8.1 mi) and its basin size is 163 km^{2} (63 sq mi).
