= Călugăreni, Giurgiu =

Călugăreni
- Commune
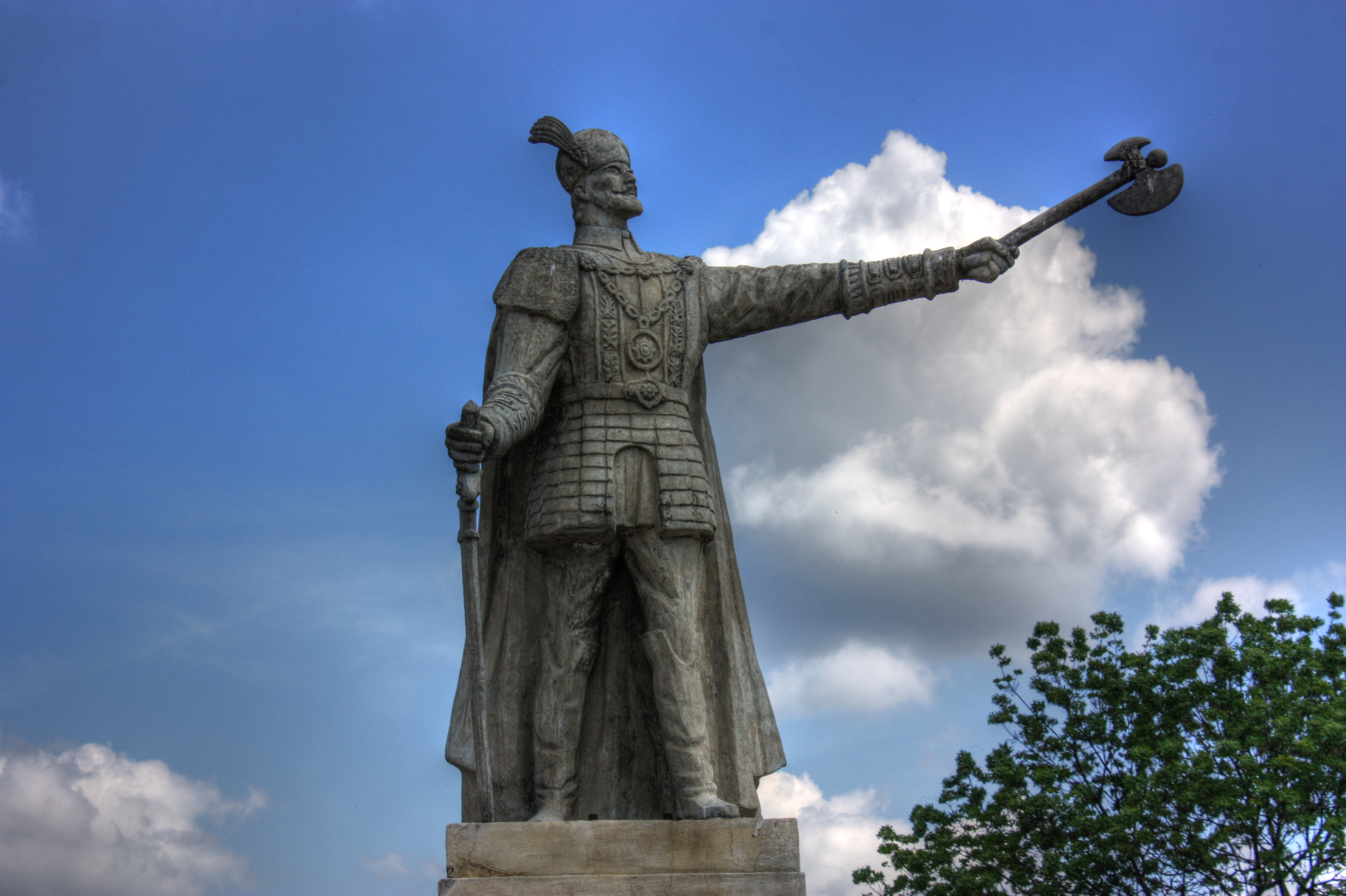
- Statue of Michael the Brave in Călugăreni

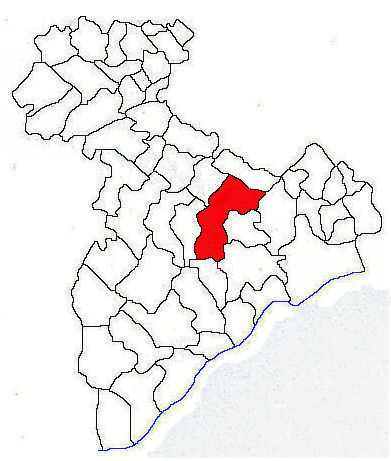
- Location in Giurgiu County

- Location in Romania
- Coordinates: 44.173°N 25.996°E
- Country: Romania
- County: Giurgiu

Government
  - Mayor (2020–2024): Dumitru Iordache (PNL)
- Area: 118.56 km^{2} (45.78 sq mi)
- Elevation: 53 m (174 ft)
- Population (2021-12-01): 5,523
  - Density: 46.58/km^{2} (120.7/sq mi)
- Time zone: UTC+02:00 (EET)
  - Summer (DST): UTC+03:00 (EEST)
- Postal code: 087040
- Area code: +(40) 246
- Vehicle reg.: GR
- Website: primariacalugareni.ro

Călugăreni is a commune located in Giurgiu County, Muntenia, Romania. It is composed of five villages: Brăniștari, Călugăreni, Crucea de Piatră, Hulubești, and Uzunu.

The commune is situated in the Wallachian Plain, at an altitude of 53 m (174 ft), on the banks of the Neajlov River and its right tributaries, the Câlniștea and the Iordana. It is located in the central part of the county, 33 km (21 mi) north of the county seat, Giurgiu, and 30 km (19 mi) south of the country's capital, Bucharest.

The commune is famous for the Battle of Călugăreni of 23 August 1595. This was one of the most important battles in the history of mediaeval Romania, in which a Wallachian army led by Michael the Brave defeated an Ottoman army led by Koca Sinan Pasha.

Historical population
Year	Pop.	±%
2002	6,549	—
2011	6,148	−6.1%
2021	5,523	−10.2%
Source: Census data

== Natives ==
- Nicolae Cartojan (1883 – 1944), literary historian
