= Iordana =

- Location within Romania

Location
- Country: Romania
- Counties: Giurgiu County
- Villages: Uzunu

Physical characteristics
- Mouth: Câlniștea
  - location: Uzunu
  - coordinates: 44°10′0″N 25°57′44″E
  - elevation: 50 m (160 ft)
- Length: 11 km (6.8 mi)
- Basin size: 47 km^{2} (18 sq mi)

Basin features
- Progression: Câlniștea→ Neajlov→ Argeș→ Danube→ Black Sea

The Iordana is a right tributary of the river Câlniștea in Romania. It discharges into the Câlniștea in Uzunu. Its length is 11 km (6.8 mi) and its basin size is 47 km^{2} (18 sq mi).
