= Schitu, Giurgiu =

Schitu
- Commune
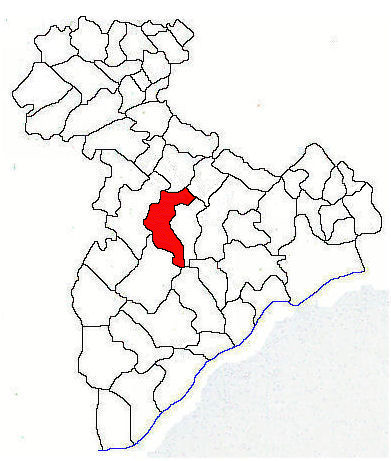
- Location in Giurgiu County

- Location in Romania
- Coordinates: 44°8′N 25°51′E
- Country: Romania
- County: Giurgiu

Government
  - Mayor (2020–2024): Ionel Pașol (PNL)
- Area: 55.86 km^{2} (21.57 sq mi)
- Elevation: 81 m (266 ft)
- Population (2021-12-01): 1,660
  - Density: 30/km^{2} (77/sq mi)
- Time zone: EET/EEST (UTC+2/+3)
- Postal code: 087200
- Area code: +(40) 246
- Vehicle reg.: GR
- Website: primariaschitugr.ro

Schitu is a commune located in Giurgiu County, Muntenia, Romania. It is composed of four villages: Bila, Cămineasca, Schitu, and Vlașin.

The commune is situated in the Wallachian Plain, at an altitude of 81 m (266 ft), on the banks of the river Câlniștea and its left tributary, the Glavacioc. It is located in the central part of the county, 31 km (19 mi) north of the county seat, Giurgiu, and 48 km (30 mi) southwest of the country's capital, Bucharest.

Historical population
Year	Pop.	±%
2002	2,262	—
2011	1,985	−12.2%
2021	1,660	−16.4%
Source: Census data
