= Ismar (river) =

River in Romania

- Location within Romania

Location
- Country: Romania
- Counties: Giurgiu County

Physical characteristics
- Source
  - coordinates: 43°58′15″N 25°47′40″E
  - elevation: 85 m (279 ft)
- Mouth: Câlniștea
  - coordinates: 44°08′53″N 25°46′42″E
  - elevation: 69 m (226 ft)
- Length: 27 km (17 mi)
- Basin size: 161 km^{2} (62 sq mi)

Basin features
- Progression: Câlniștea→ Neajlov→ Argeș→ Danube→ Black Sea
- Tributaries
  - left: Negrile

The Ismar is a right tributary of the river Câlniștea in Romania. It discharges into the Câlniștea in Naipu. It flows through the villages Radu Vodă, Dimitrie Cantemir, Izvoarele, Chiriacu and Petru Rareș. Its length is 27 km (17 mi) and its basin size is 161 km^{2} (62 sq mi).
