= Ismar (given name) =

Ismar is a masculine given name. Notable people with this name include:

- Ismar Biogradlić (born 1974), Bosnian luger
- Ismar David (1910–1996), artist
- Ismar Elbogen (1874–1943), German rabbi, scholar, and historian
- Ismar Gorčić (born 1983), Bosnian tennis player
- Ismar Hairlahović (born 1996), Bosnian footballer
- Ismar Isidor Boas (1858–1938), German gastroenterologist
- Ismar Schorsch, professor
- Ismar Tandir (born 1995), German and Bosnian footballer
- Ismar Volić, Bosnian-American mathematician
