= Izvoarele, Giurgiu =

Izvoarele
- Commune
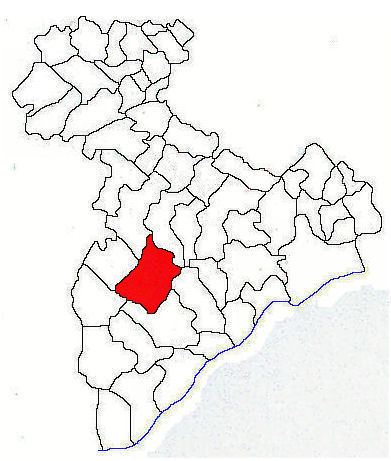
- Location in Giurgiu County

- Location in Romania
- Coordinates: 44.039°N 25.776°E
- Country: Romania
- County: Giurgiu

Government
  - Mayor (2020–2024): Silviu-Marius Cazacu (PSD)
- Area: 140.09 km^{2} (54.09 sq mi)
- Elevation: 85 m (279 ft)
- Population (2021-12-01): 3,162
  - Density: 23/km^{2} (58/sq mi)
- Time zone: EET/EEST (UTC+2/+3)
- Postal code: 87140
- Area code: +(40) 246
- Vehicle reg.: GR
- Website: comunaisvoarele.ro

Izvoarele is a commune located in Giurgiu County, Muntenia, Romania. It is composed of six villages: Chiriacu, Dimitrie Cantemir, Izvoarele, Petru Rareș, Radu Vodă, and Valea Bujorului.

Historical population
Year	Pop.	±%
2002	4,825	—
2011	3,930	−18.5%
2021	3,162	−19.5%
Source: Census data
