= Alvania ismar =

Alvania ismar Temporal range: Pleistocene

Scientific classification
- Kingdom: Animalia
- Phylum: Mollusca
- Class: Gastropoda
- Subclass: Caenogastropoda
- Order: Littorinimorpha
- Family: Rissoidae
- Genus: Alvania
- Species: †A. ismar

Binomial name
- †Alvania ismar Amati, Taviani & Oliverio, 2024

Species of gastropod

Alvania ismar is an extinct species of minute sea snail, a marine gastropod mollusk or micromollusk in the family Rissoidae.

== Distribution ==
The species occurred at the Strait of Sicily in the Pleistocene at depths of 649 meters.

== Description ==
The species had a height of 2.87 mm and a width of 1.7 mm. The species had a medium sized, ovate-conical shell, with a spiral sculpture on the whole teleoconch. Strong axial ribs do not reach the base and the inner side of the outer lip is without denticles, protoconch is paucispiral.
