= Cârțișoara (river) =

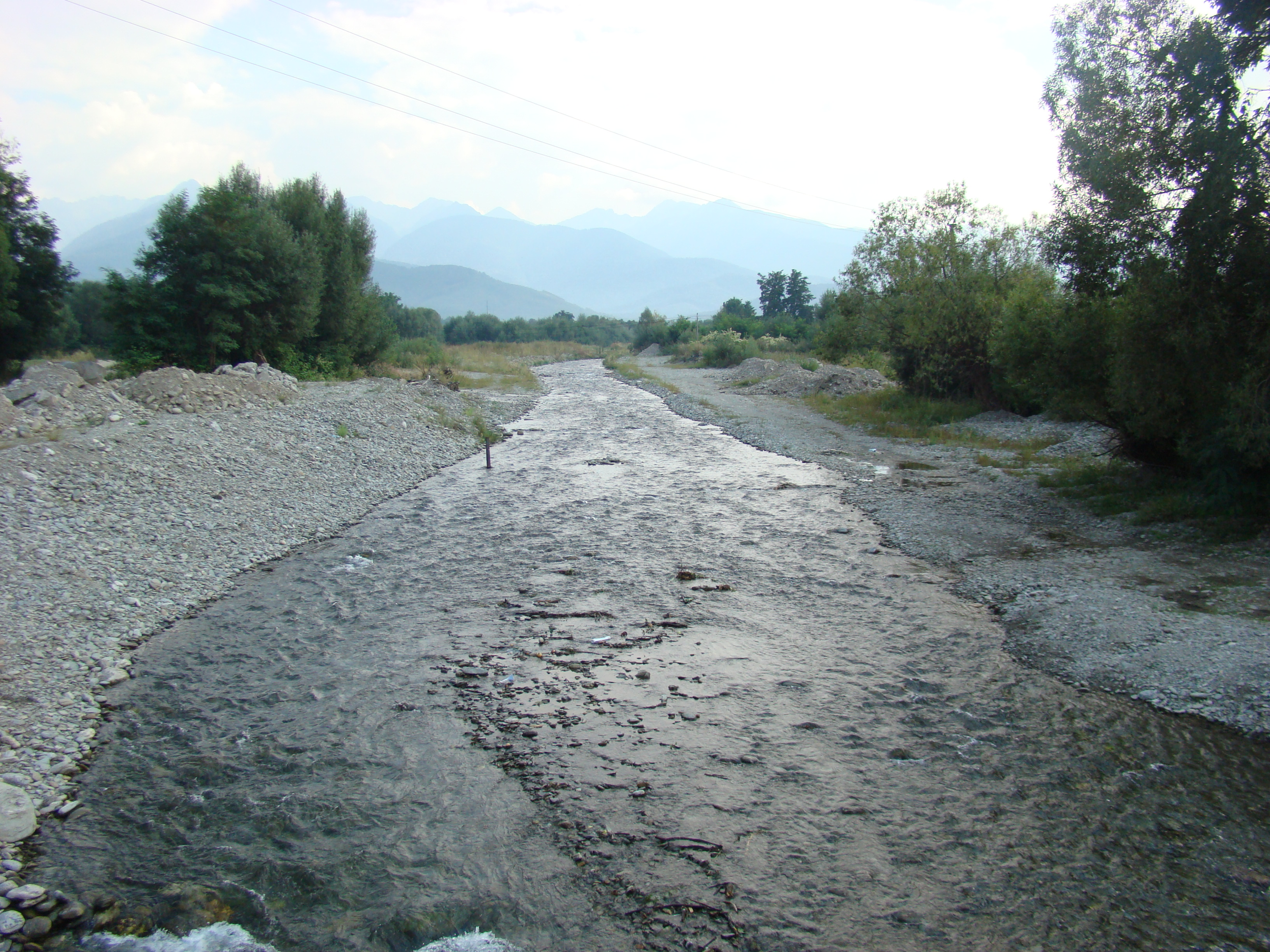
- The Cârțișoara near the village Cârțișoara

- Location within Romania

Location
- Country: Romania
- Counties: Sibiu County
- Villages: Cârțișoara, Cârța

Physical characteristics
- Source: Near Bâlea Lake, Făgăraș Mountains
- Mouth: Olt
  - location: Cârța
  - coordinates: 45.7958°N 24.5580°E
- Length: 24 km (15 mi)
- Basin size: 79 km^{2} (31 sq mi)
- Discharge
  - location: *
  - average: 2.07 m^{3}/s (73 cu ft/s)

Basin features
- Progression: Olt→ Danube→ Black Sea
- Tributaries
  - left: Pârâul Doamnei, Laița
  - right: Seaca

The Cârțișoara (Hungarian: Kerci-patak) is a left tributary of the river Olt in Romania. The source of the Cârțișoara is near Bâlea Lake in the Făgăraș Mountains. It discharges into the Olt in Cârța. Its length is 24 km (15 mi) and its basin size is 79 km^{2} (31 sq mi).
