= Râiosul =

Râiosul Ileana
- Location within Romania

Location
- Country: Romania
- Counties: Giurgiu County
- Villages: Naipu

Physical characteristics
- Mouth: Câlniștea
  - location: Naipu
  - coordinates: 44°06′21″N 25°45′44″E
  - elevation: 60 m (200 ft)
- Length: 12 km (7.5 mi)
- Basin size: 50 km^{2} (19 sq mi)

Basin features
- Progression: Câlniștea→ Neajlov→ Argeș→ Danube→ Black Sea

The Râiosul or Ileana is a left tributary of the river Câlniștea in Romania. It flows into the Câlniștea in Naipu. Its length is 12 km (7.5 mi) and its basin size is 50 km^{2} (19 sq mi).
