= Stoenești, Giurgiu =

Stoenești
- Commune
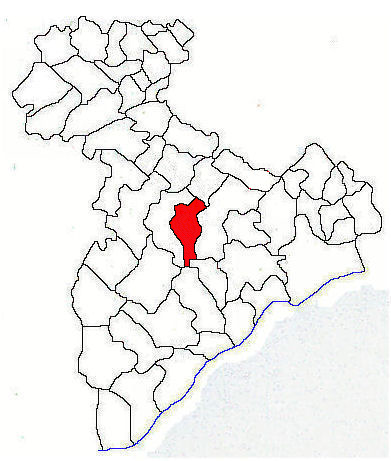
- Location in Giurgiu County

- Location in Romania
- Coordinates: 44.1377°N 25.8899°E
- Country: Romania
- County: Giurgiu

Government
  - Mayor (2024–2028): Preda Alexandru Vladu (PNL)
- Area: 48.2 km^{2} (18.6 sq mi)
- Elevation: 59 m (194 ft)
- Population (2021-12-01): 1,930
  - Density: 40/km^{2} (100/sq mi)
- Time zone: EET/EEST (UTC+2/+3)
- Postal code: 087220
- Area code: +(40) 246
- Vehicle reg.: GR
- Website: www.comunastoenesti.ro

Stoenești is a commune located in Giurgiu County, Muntenia, Romania. It is composed of three villages: Ianculești, Mirău, and Stoenești.

Historical population
Year	Pop.	±%
2002	2,582	—
2011	2,249	−12.9%
2021	1,930	−14.2%
Source: Census data
