= Cârța, Sibiu =

Cârța Cârța Săsească
- Commune
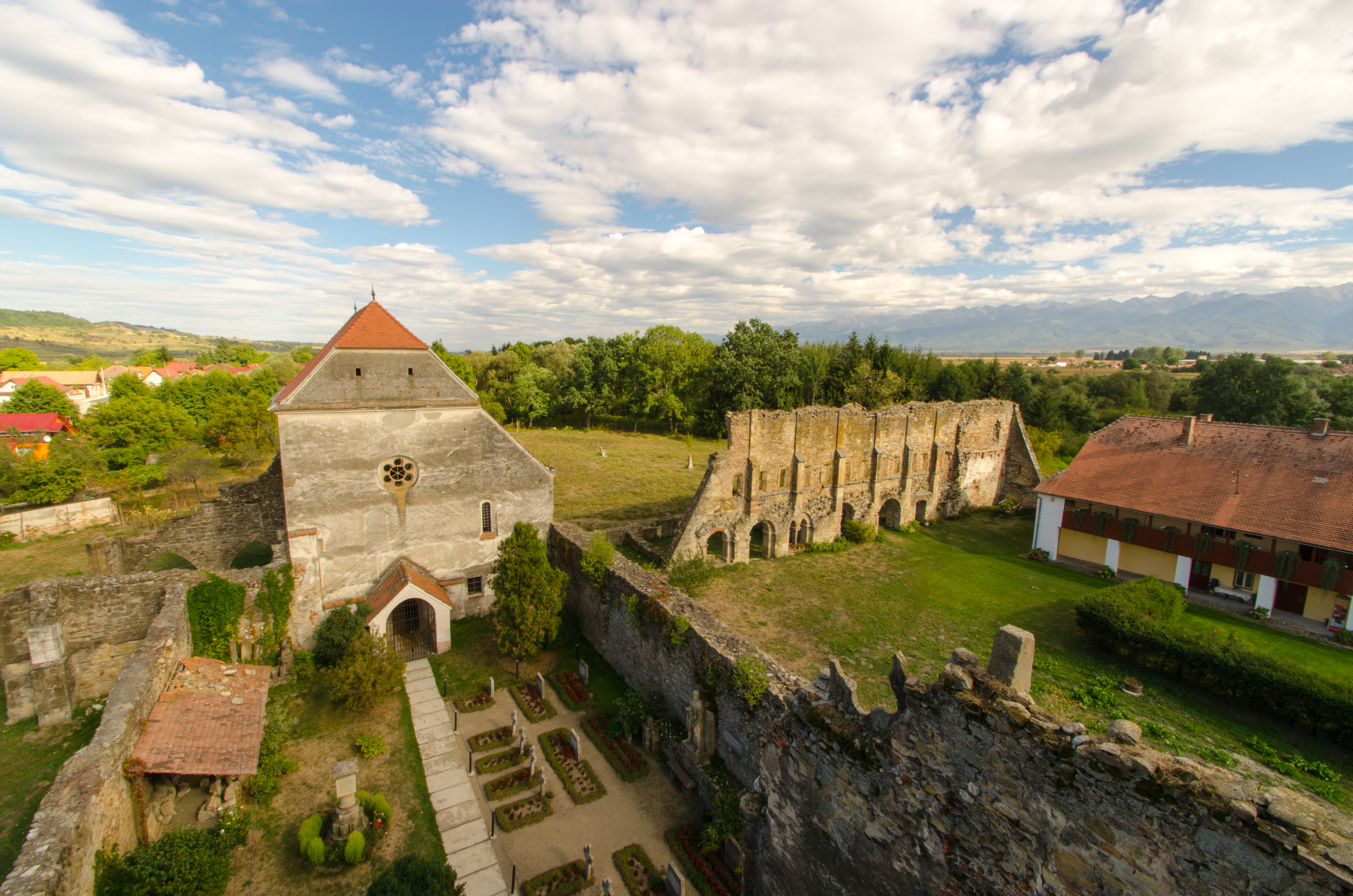
- Cârța Monastery

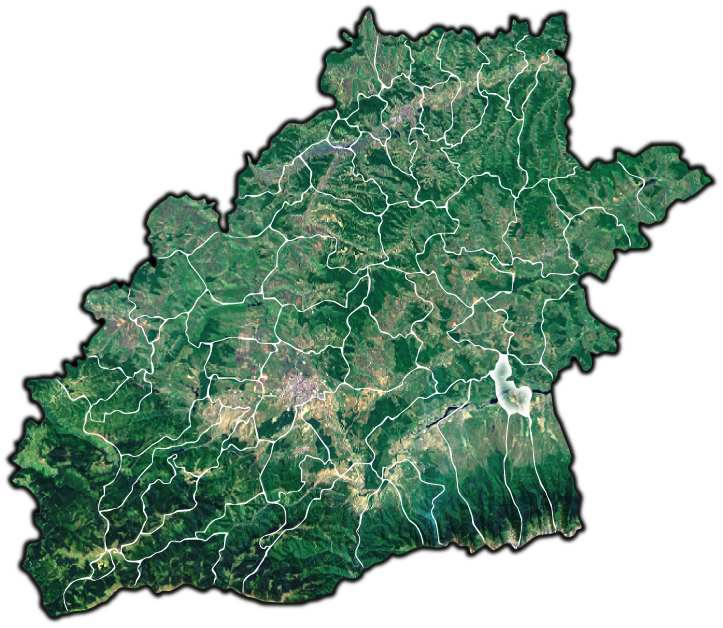
- Location in Sibiu County

- Location in Romania
- Coordinates: 45°47′4″N 24°34′4″E
- Country: Romania
- County: Sibiu

Government
  - Mayor (2020–2024): Daniel Cândulețiu (PNL)
- Area: 28.9 km^{2} (11.2 sq mi)
- Elevation: 406 m (1,332 ft)
- Population (2021-12-01): 1,042
  - Density: 36.1/km^{2} (93.4/sq mi)
- Time zone: UTC+02:00 (EET)
  - Summer (DST): UTC+03:00 (EEST)
- Postal code: 557070
- Area code: +(40) 0269
- Vehicle reg.: SB
- Website: comunacarta.ro

Cârța (also Cârța Săsească, Romanian: [ˈkɨrtsa səˈse̯askə]; German: Kerz; Hungarian: Kerc) is a commune in Sibiu County, Transylvania, Romania. It is composed of two villages, Cârța and Poienița (Konradsdorf; Oláhtyúkos).
