= Botoroaga =

- Commune
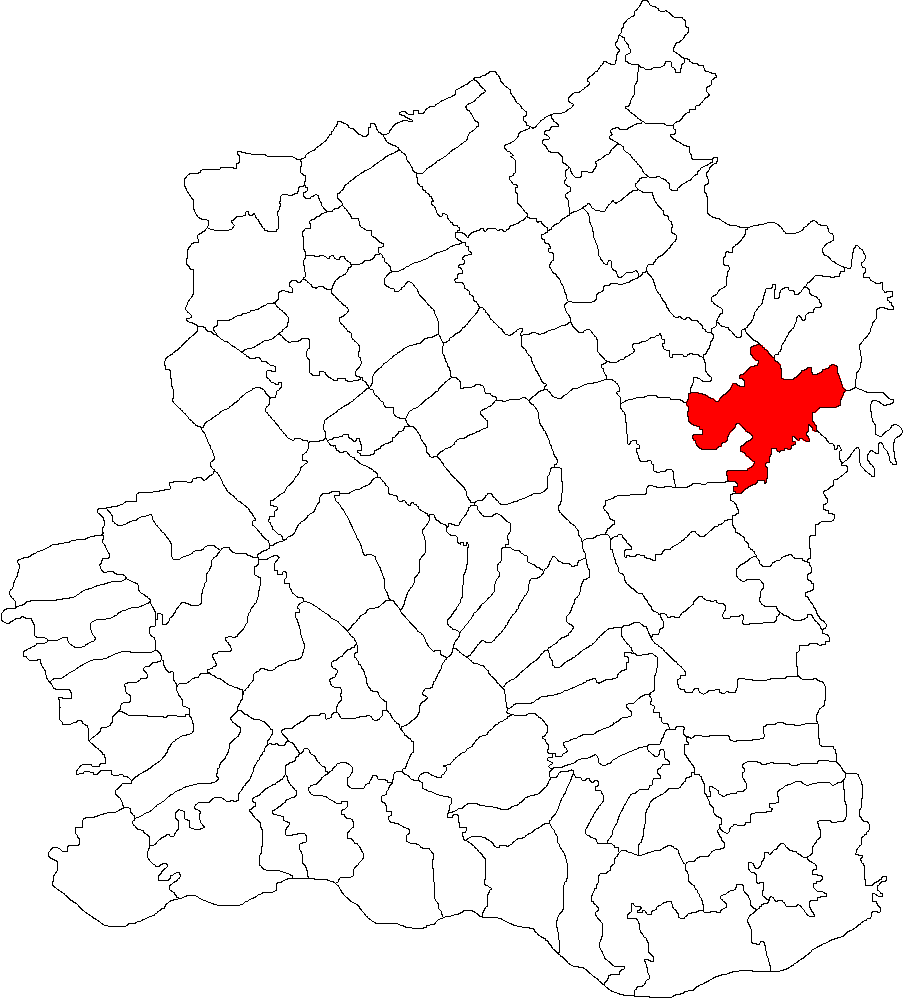
- Location in Teleorman County

- Location in Romania
- Coordinates: 44°08′54″N 25°32′41″E
- Country: Romania
- County: Teleorman
- Subdivisions: Botoroaga, Călugăru, Târnava, Tunari, Valea Cireșului

Government
  - Mayor (2024–2028): Gheorghiță Ivan-Parpală (PSD)
- Area: 101.61 km^{2} (39.23 sq mi)
- Elevation: 85 m (279 ft)
- Population (2021-12-01): 4,588
  - Density: 45/km^{2} (120/sq mi)
- Time zone: EET/EEST (UTC+2/+3)
- Postal code: 147025
- Area code: +(40) 247
- Vehicle reg.: TR
- Website: www.botoroaga.ro

Botoroaga (Romanian pronunciation: [botoˈro̯aɡa]) is a commune in Teleorman County, Muntenia, Romania. It is composed of five villages: Botoroaga, Călugăru, Târnava, Tunari, and Valea Cireșului.
