= Răsuceni =

- Commune
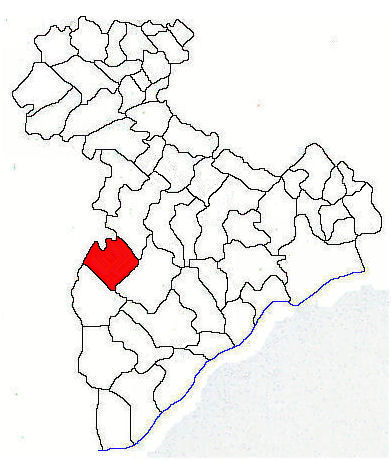
- Location in Giurgiu County

- Location in Romania
- Coordinates: 44°5′N 25°40′E
- Country: Romania
- County: Giurgiu

Government
  - Mayor (2020–2024): Costel Spălatu (PNL)
- Area: 79.32 km^{2} (30.63 sq mi)
- Elevation: 76 m (249 ft)
- Population (2021-12-01): 2,144
  - Density: 27.03/km^{2} (70.01/sq mi)
- Time zone: EET/EEST (UTC+2/+3)
- Postal code: 087190
- Area code: +(40) x46
- Vehicle reg.: GR
- Website: www.comunarasuceni.ro

Răsuceni is a commune located in Giurgiu County, Muntenia, Romania. It is composed of four villages: Carapancea, Cucuruzu, Răsuceni, and Satu Nou.

Historical population
Year	Pop.	±%
2002	3,138	—
2011	2,652	−15.5%
2021	2,144	−19.2%
Source: Census data

== Natives ==
- Rodica Popescu Bitănescu (born 1938), actress
