= Domnești, Ilfov =

Domnești
- Commune
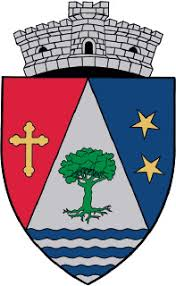
- Coat of arms

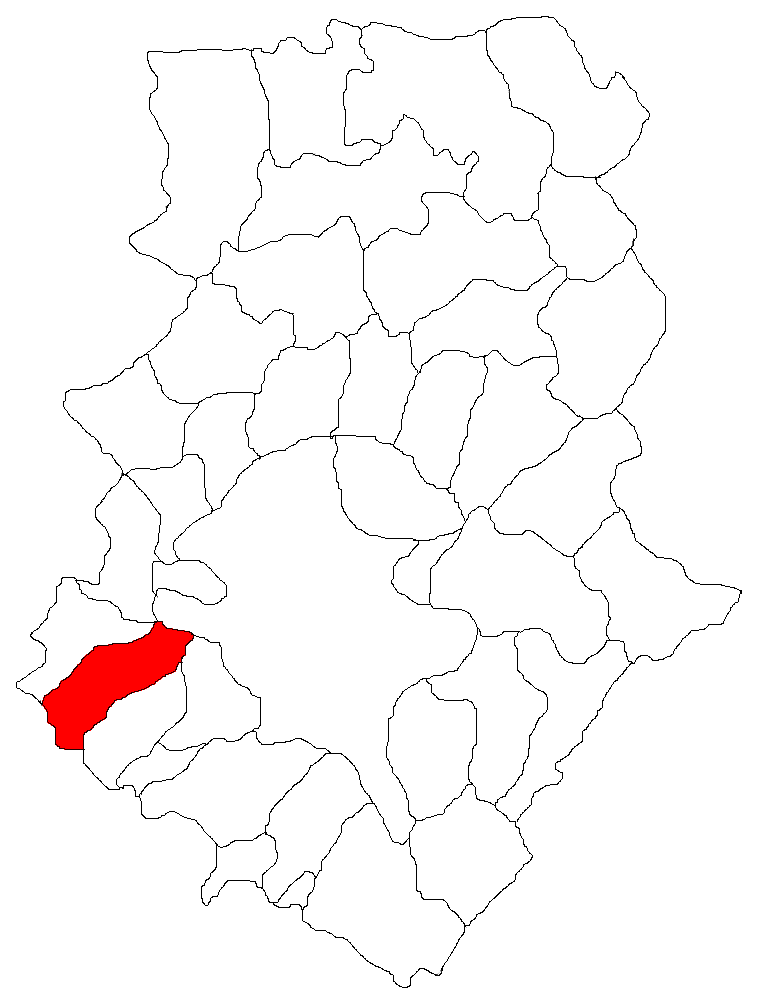
- Location in Ilfov County

- Location in Romania
- Coordinates: 44°24′N 25°55′E
- Country: Romania
- County: Ilfov

Government
  - Mayor (2024–2028): Ioan-Adrian Ghiță (PNL)
- Area: 38 km^{2} (15 sq mi)
- Elevation: 90 m (300 ft)
- Population (2021-12-01): 12,861
  - Density: 340/km^{2} (880/sq mi)
- Time zone: UTC+02:00 (EET)
  - Summer (DST): UTC+03:00 (EEST)
- Postal code: 077090
- Area code: +(40) 21
- Vehicle reg.: IF
- Website: www.primariadomnesti.ro

Domnești is a commune in the southwestern part of Ilfov County, Muntenia, Romania. Its name is derived from "Domn" (Lord, referring to the ruler of Wallachia) and suffix "-ești". It is composed of two villages, Domnești and Țegheș.

The commune is located west of Bucharest, on the banks of the Ciorogârla and Sabar rivers, and on the left bank of the Argeș River. It is crossed by county road DJ602, which leads east to the Ghencea Extension neighborhood of Bucharest and north-east to Ciorogârla and further into Giurgiu County to Joița and Săbăreni, then returning to Ilfov County in Chitila (where it intersects with DN7) and Buftea (where it ends in DN1A).

The Domneștii de Sus halt serves the CFR Line 900, which connects Bucharest with the western city of Timișoara.

Historical population
Year	Pop.	±%
2002	6,327	—
2011	8,682	+37.2%
2021	12,861	+48.1%
Source: Census data
