= Ciurea (surname) =

Ciurea is a surname. Notable people with the surname include:

- Aurelia Ciurea (born 1982), Romanian gymnast
- Constantin Stamati-Ciurea (1828–1898), Romanian writer and translator
- Cornel Ciurea (born 1972), Moldovan politician
- Tudorancea Ciurea (1888–1971), Romanian army general
