= Teiușu =

Teiuşu may refer to several villages in Romania:

- Teiuşu, a village in Isvoarele Commune, Giurgiu County
- Teiuşu, a village in Brebeni Commune, Olt County
- Teiuşu, a village in Buneşti Commune, Vâlcea County

== See also ==
- Teiuș
