= Colibași =

Colibași may refer to several places in Romania:

- Colibași, Giurgiu, a commune in Giurgiu County
- Colibași, a village in Mioveni Town, Argeș County, and Mioveni itself, called Colibași until 1996
- Colibași, a village in Râmnicelu Commune, Buzău County
- Colibași, a village in Iedera Commune, Dâmbovița County
- Colibași, a village in Scoarța Commune, Gorj County
- Colibași, a village in Malovăț Commune, Mehedinți County
- Colibași, a village in Strejești Commune, Olt County

and in Moldova:

- Colibași, Cahul, a commune in Cahul district
