= Joița =

- Commune
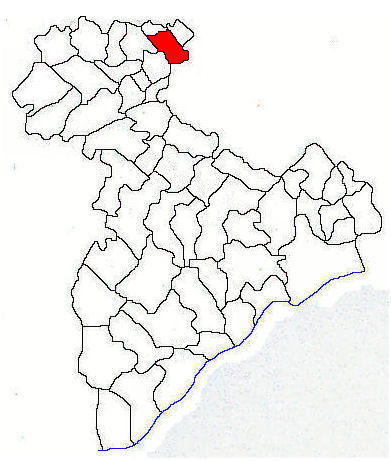
- Location in Giurgiu County

- Location in Romania
- Coordinates: 44°30′N 25°51′E
- Country: Romania
- County: Giurgiu

Government
  - Mayor (2020–2024): Constantin M. Tănase (PNL)
- Area: 23.79 km^{2} (9.19 sq mi)
- Elevation: 106 m (348 ft)
- Population (2021-12-01): 5,438
  - Density: 230/km^{2} (590/sq mi)
- Time zone: EET/EEST (UTC+2/+3)
- Postal code: 87150
- Area code: +40 246
- Vehicle reg.: GR
- Website: primariajoita.ro

Joița is a commune located in Giurgiu County, Muntenia, Romania. It is composed of two villages, Bâcu and Joița.

The commune is located on the northeastern edge of the county, on the right bank of the Dâmbovița River and on the left bank of the Ciorogârla River, on the border with Ilfov County. It is crossed by the county road DJ602, which connects it to the south with Ciorogârla and Domnești in Ilfov County (where it intersects with Centura București) and with Romania's capital, Bucharest, and to the northeast with Săbăreni and further in Ilfov County with the towns of Chitila (where it intersects with DN7) and Buftea (where it ends in DN1A).

Historical population
Year	Pop.	±%
2002	3,536	—
2011	3,864	+9.3%
2021	5,438	+40.7%
Source: Census data
