= Putineiu =

Putineiu may refer to several places in Romania:

- Putineiu, a commune in Giurgiu County
- Putineiu, a commune in Teleorman County
