= Frătești =

- Commune
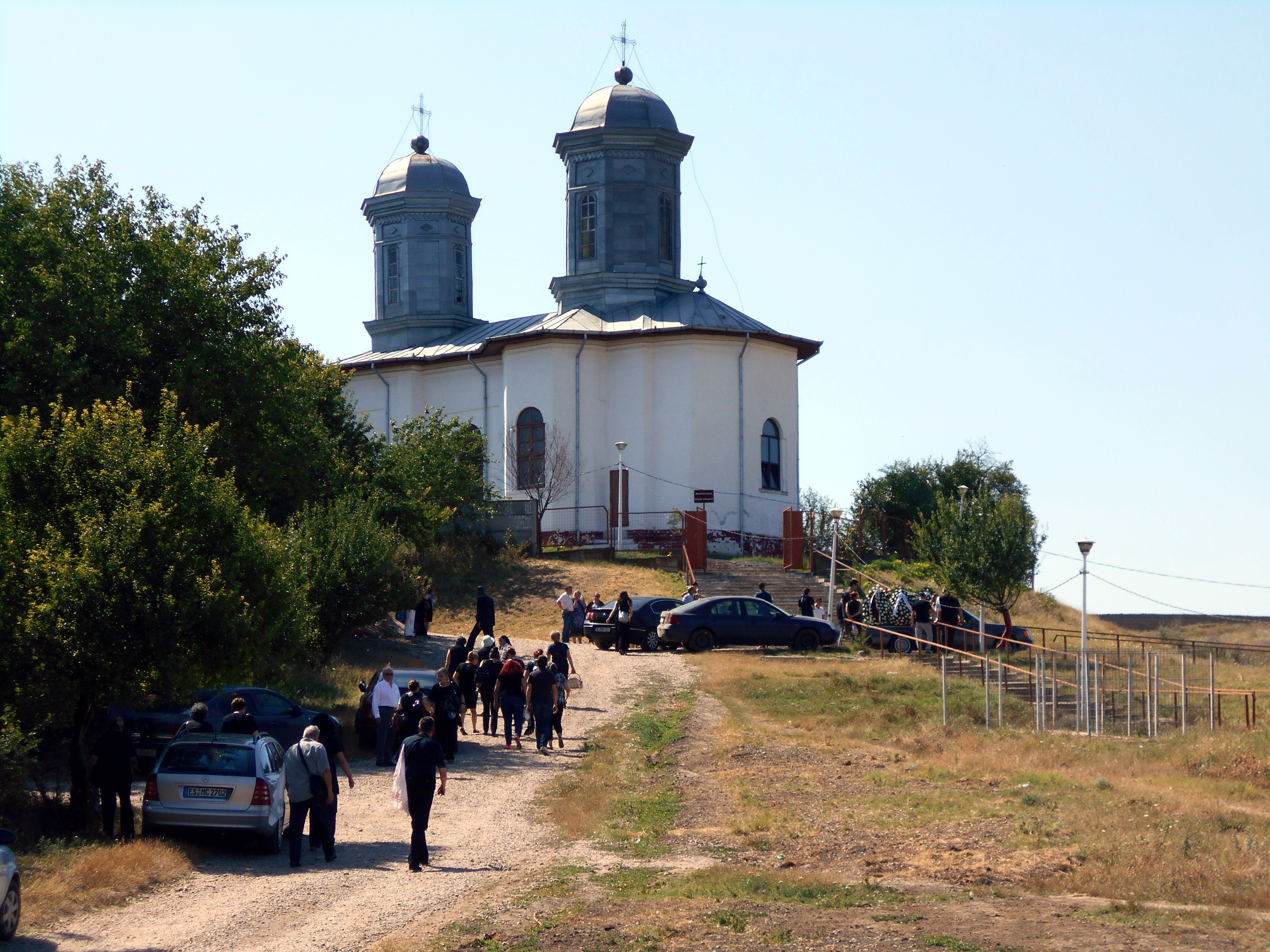
- The church in Frătești

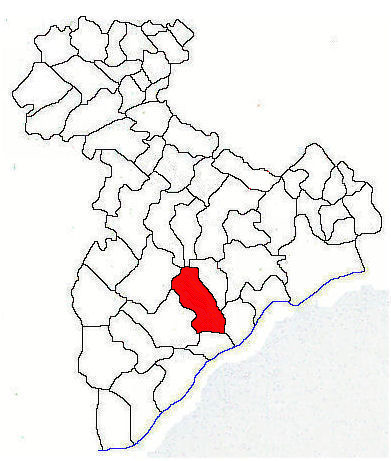
- Location in Giurgiu County

- Location in Romania
- Coordinates: 43.9908°N 25.9319°E
- Country: Romania
- County: Giurgiu

Government
  - Mayor (2020–2024): Gabriel-Marian Pană (ALDE)
- Elevation: 72 m (236 ft)
- Highest elevation: 92 m (302 ft)
- Lowest elevation: 20 m (66 ft)
- Population (2021-12-01): 5,000
- Time zone: UTC+02:00 (EET)
  - Summer (DST): UTC+03:00 (EEST)
- Postal code: 87080
- Area code: +(40) 246
- Vehicle reg.: GR
- Website: primariacomuneifratesti.ro

Frătești is a commune located in Giurgiu County, Muntenia, Romania. It is composed of three villages: Cetatea, Frătești, and Remuș.

The commune is located in the southern part of the county, bordering to the south the county seat, Giurgiu. Frătești also borders the following communes: Stănești to the west, Izvoarele to the northwest, Stoenești to the north, and Daia and Oinacu to the east.

Historical population
Year	Pop.	±%
2002	5,616	—
2011	5,361	−4.5%
2021	5,000	−6.7%
Source: Census data
