= Zorile =

Zorile may refer to several villages in Romania:

- Zorile, a village in Copăcele Commune, Caraș-Severin County
- Zorile, a village in Adamclisi Commune, Constanța County
- Zorile, a village in Grădinari Commune, Giurgiu County

and a commune in Moldova:

- Zorile, Orhei, a commune in Orhei District
