= Bâcu =

Bâcu may refer to several villages in Romania:

- Bâcu, a village in Joița Commune, Giurgiu County
- Bâcu, a village in Ipatele Commune, Iaşi County
- Marian Bâcu, Romanian former footballer
