= Vieru =

Vieru may refer to:

- Igor Vieru (1923 – 1988), Moldovan painter
- Anatol Vieru (1926 – 1998), Romanian composer
- Grigore Vieru (1935 – 2009), Moldovan poet
- Andrei Vieru (born 1958), pianist, writer and philosopher (son of Anatol)
- Valerian Ciobanu-Vieru (born 1958), Moldovan writer
- Ioan Vieru (poet) (born 1962), a Romanian poet
- Ioan Vieru (born 1979), Romanian sprinter
- Natalia Vieru (born 1989), Moldavian-born Russian basketball player
- Vieru, a village in Putineiu Commune, Giurgiu County, Romania
