= 1907 Romanian peasants' revolt =

Peasant revolt

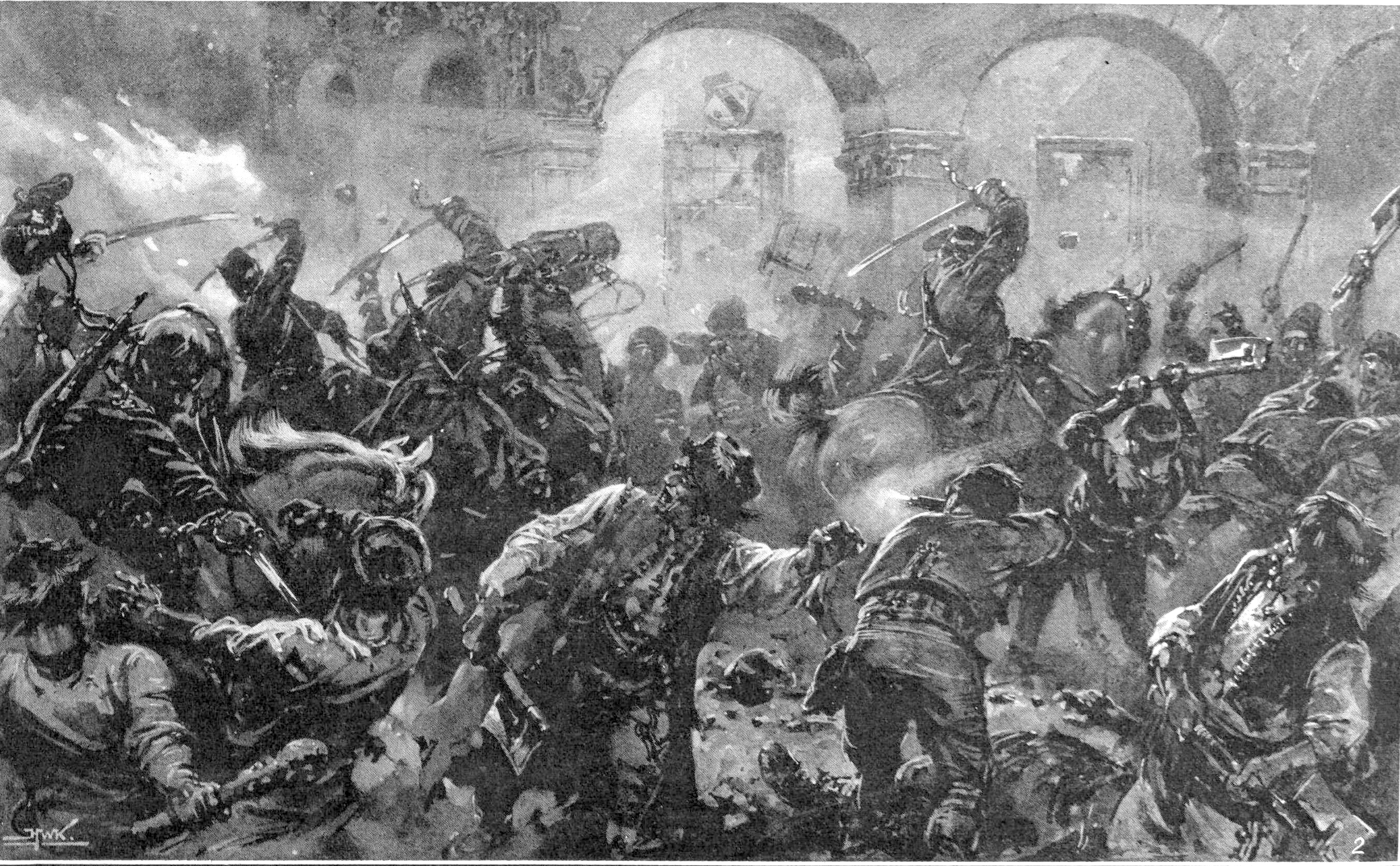
- A cavalry patrol sabring rioters in the streets of Comănești (Illustrated London News)
Date	21 February – 5 April 1907
Location	Kingdom of Romania
Result	Creation of the Siguranța

Belligerents
Kingdom of Romania: Romanian Army; Romanian police and Gendarmerie; Large landowners and their intermediaries	Disaffected peasants

Commanders and leaders
Carol I Gheorghe Cantacuzino; Dimitrie Sturdza; Alexandru Averescu; Ion I. C. Brătianu	Trifan Roman Grosu; Ion Dolhescu; Grigore Roman (the initiators and leaders of the Flămânzi revolters); Supported by: Constantin Mille; Constantin Dobrogeanu-Gherea; Octav Băncilă; Christian Rakovsky; Ștefan Gheorghiu

Casualties and losses
Army: 10 killed, 4 wounded Unknown numbers of landowners and lessors killed or wounded	Official count: 419 killed 1,786 (Dabija) to 11,000 (Chirot et Ragin) killed 10,000 arrested

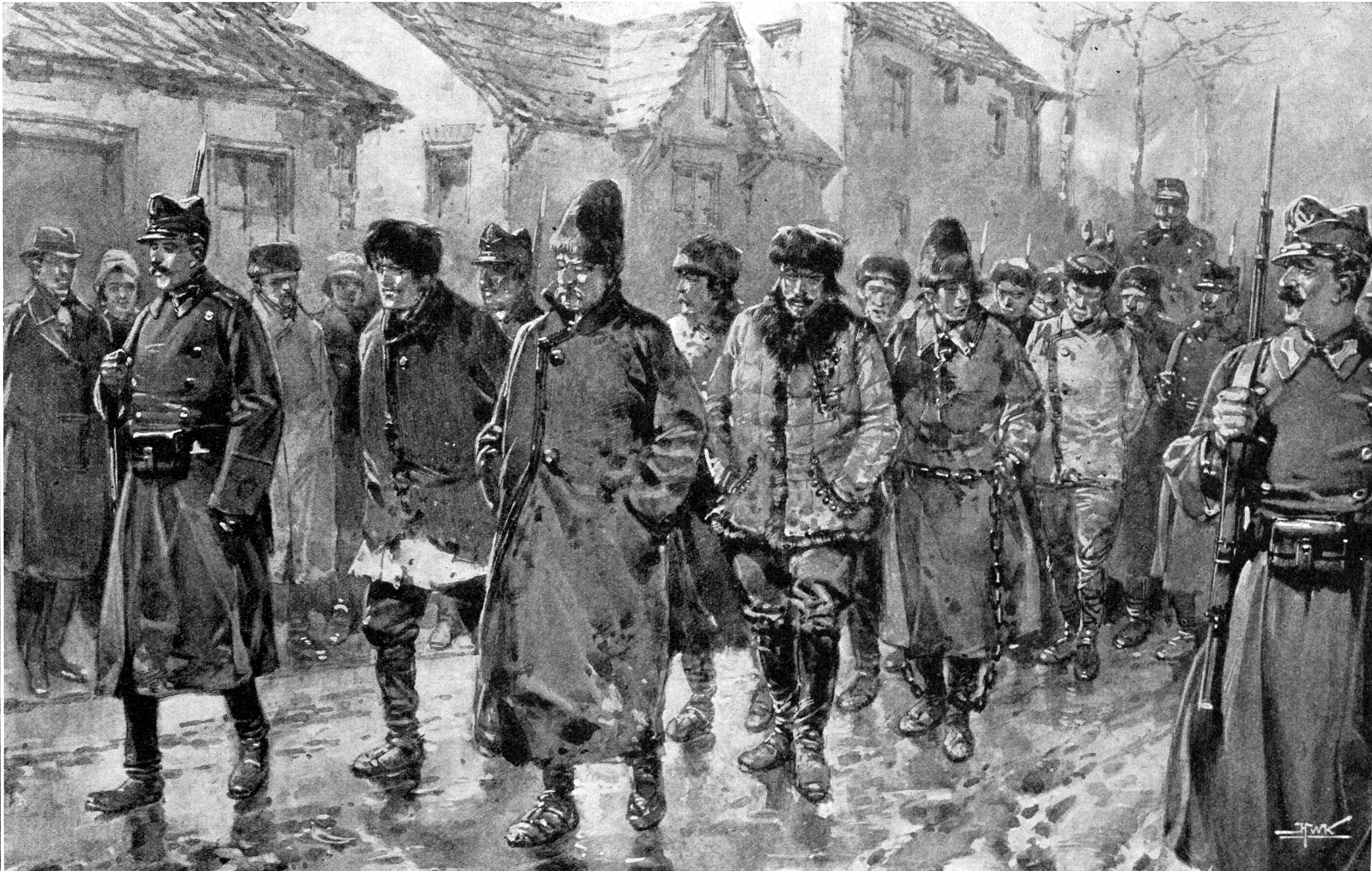
Infantry escorting prisoners through Piatra Neamț (Illustrated London News)

The Peasant Uprising of 1907 (Romanian: Răscoala țărănească din 1907) took place in Romania between 21 February and 5 April 1907. It started in northern Moldavia and, after three weeks in which it was localized in that area, it quickly spread, reaching Wallachia, including as far as Oltenia. The main cause was the discontent of the peasants over the inequity of land ownership, which was mostly in the hands of just a few large landowners.

Following the fall of the Conservative Party government on March 12, the new Liberal government crushed the revolt violently with the help of the Romanian Army, killing thousands of peasants in the process.

== Background ==
The 1864 land reforms gave the peasants full ownership rights for part of the land for which they previously had only the right to use. However, the peasants remained even after these reforms dependent on the local landlords. Additionally, the peasant population was rising fast, leading to rapidly shrinking properties: from an average family property of 3.42 hectares (8.5 acres) in 1896 down to 3.27 ha (8.1 acres) in 1905 and 3.06 ha (7.6 acres) in 1907. The state was also a big landholder; however, its policies for selling the land often did not favor poorer peasants, who were in the greatest need for land.

Needing to supplement their shrinking properties, the peasants were forced to use land owned by the landlords, who owned large estates. As population grew, the peasants became more and more desperate for land, leading to rapidly rising rents. At that time, peasants formed up to 80% of the Romanian population and about 60% of them owned small plots, or no land at all, while the large landowners owned more than half of the arable land.

The National Liberal Party's policy to encourage peasant cooperatives was not successful, as many landlords feared the organization of the peasants, preferring to lease to individual peasants rather than to cooperatives. According to Ioan Lahovary, the Conservative Minister of Domains, a landlord could drive out a peasant refusing to pay his rent, but noted that for driving out a cooperative of 500 peasants, a regiment would be needed and the government may refuse to put it at the landlord's disposal. As such, by the end of 1907, there were only 103 village cooperatives having a membership of 11,118 leasing 37,344 hectares (92,280 acres), most of it leased from the state.

By 1900, most large landowners preferred to live in the cities and did not want to bother with the administration of their properties. Therefore, the peasants no longer leased directly from the landowner, but sub-leased it from an intermediary lessor (arendaș, or Arendators). The fall of the price of grain on the world markets meant that the lessors would demand ever greater rents in order to make ends meet.

The blame for the revolt was initially put on Jewish intermediaries, given that many of the lessors were of Jewish background, especially in Northern Moldavia. The revolt quickly spread southward, losing some of its anti-Semitic character and becoming basically a protest against the existing system of land tenure.

== Course of events ==
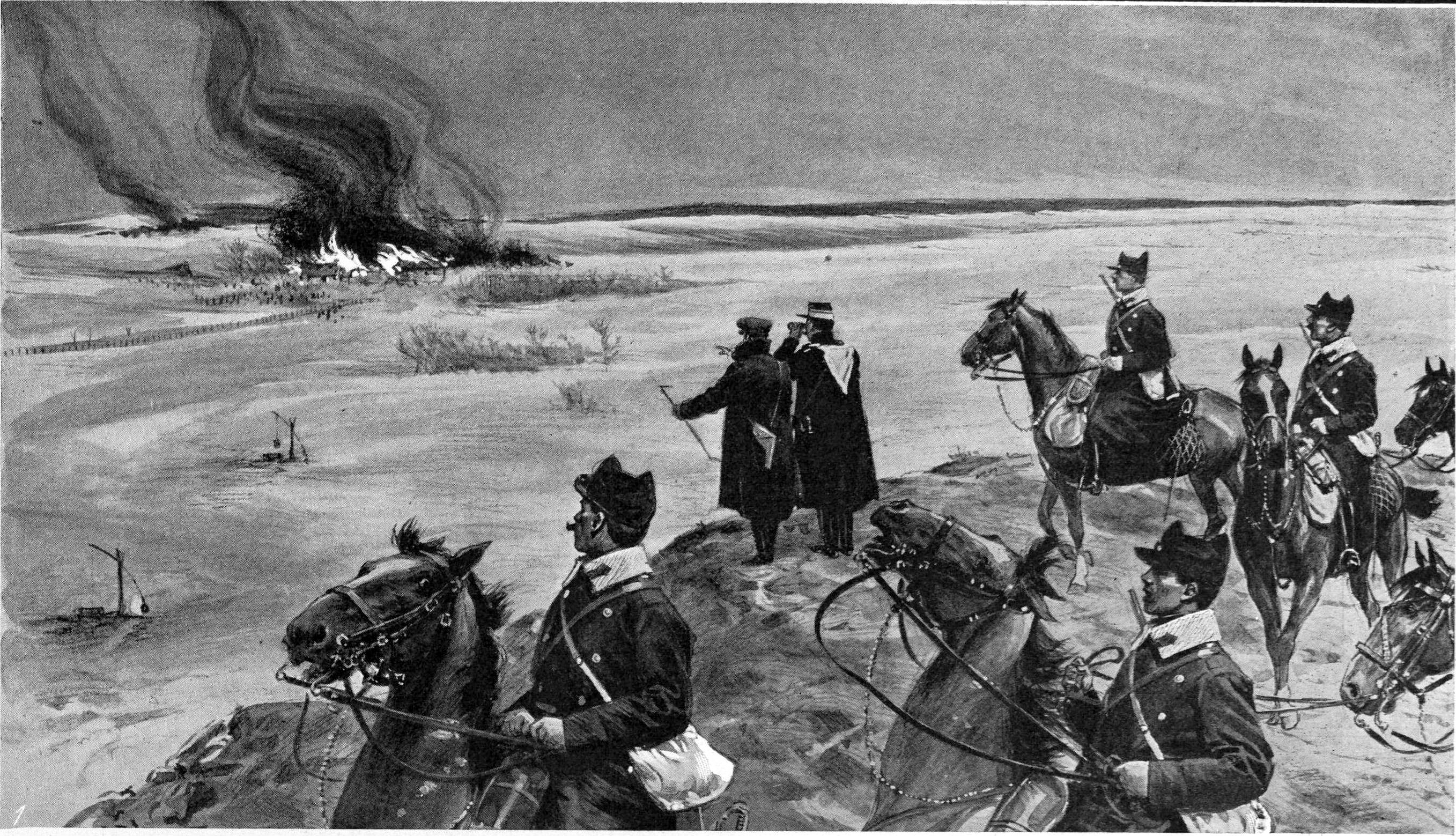
A cavalry patrol watching the burning of farmhouses by the rioters near Buzău.

The revolt began on the lands administered by one lessor, Mochi Fischer, in the village of Flămânzi by Trifan Roman Grosu, Ion Dolhescu, and Grigore Roman, due to Fischer's refusal to renew the leases of the local peasants. Fischer used to lease about 75% of the arable land in three Romanian counties in Moldavia (the so-called "Fischerland").

The peasants, fearing that they would remain without work and, more importantly, without food, began to act violently. Scared, Fischer fled to a friend in Cernăuți, leaving the peasants without signed contracts. The fear of remaining out of work, combined with the activities of alleged Austro-Hungarian instigators, led the peasants to revolt. The revolt soon spread across most of Moldavia, with several landowners' properties destroyed and many lessors killed or wounded. The Conservative government (Partidul Conservator), led by Prime Minister Gheorghe Grigore Cantacuzino, couldn't handle the situation and resigned, and the Liberals (Partidul Național-Liberal) of Dimitrie Sturdza assumed power, with Ion I. C. Brătianu as Minister of the Interior and General Alexandru Averescu as Minister of War.

On 18 March a state of emergency was declared, and then a general mobilization, with 140,000 soldiers being recruited by 29 March. The Romanian Army began firing on the peasants; thousands of peasants perished and more than 10,000 were arrested.

== Casualties ==
=== Peasants ===
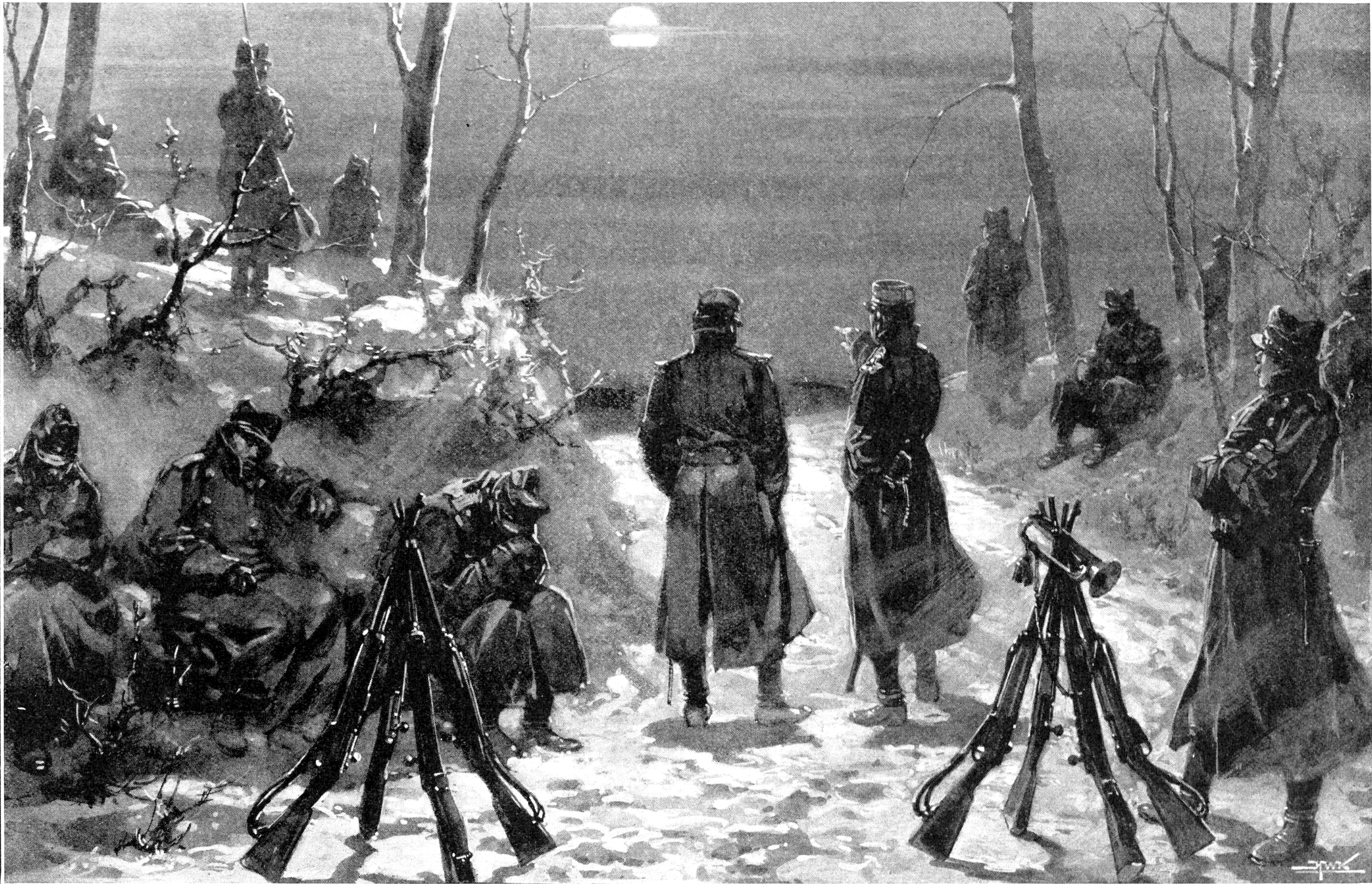
A vedette waiting on the highway at Brăila for an expected attack by peasants.

The exact number of peasant deaths is unknown, and even the course of events are not clear, because the government, to hide the size of the massacre, ordered the destruction of all documents relating to the uprising.

Historian Markus Bauer mentions a greatly underestimated official figure of 419 deaths, while an unofficial figure, circulated by the press and widely accepted, of about 10,000 peasants killed, has never been proven to be true. The same figure of 419 deaths was mentioned by Ion I. C. Brătianu in the Parliament of Romania. The data available to the Prime Minister Dimitrie Sturdza indicated 421 deaths between 28 March and 5 April 1907. Likewise, about 112 were injured and 1,751 detained. Newspapers patronized by Constantin Mille, Adevărul and Dimineața, gave a figure of 12,000–13,000 victims. In a conversation with the British ambassador in Bucharest, King Carol I mentioned a figure of "several thousand".

Prince Johann of Schönburg-Hartenstein, the minister plenipotentiary of Austria-Hungary in Bucharest at the time, and also General Averescu estimated the number of dead between 1,000–2,000. According to figures given by Austrian diplomats, between 3,000-5,000 peasants were killed, while the French Embassy mentioned a death toll ranging between 10,000–20,000. Historians put the figures between 3,000–18,000, the most common being 11,000 victims.

Another assessment of the number of victims was made by Major Gheorghe Dabija who in February 1910 was appointed by General Grigore C. Crăiniceanu to analyze 32 files that referred to this event. Based on these documents, Dabija drew up a 117-page report which he submitted to the Ministry of War, from which it emerged that 1,786 peasants had been shot.

=== Army ===
Only ten members of the Army were killed in the revolt: an officer, Lt. I. Nițulescu, killed in Stănești, Giurgiu County, two sergeants and seven soldiers. Four others were injured: an officer, Capt. Grigore Mareș, also wounded in Stănești, two sergeants and a soldier. Seventy-five soldiers of the Fifth Dorobanți Regiment ("Vlașca") appeared before military courts charged with revolt; 61 were sentenced to hard labor for life and 14 to five years in prison.

== Aftermath ==
Many intellectuals, among them Nicolae Iorga, Alexandru Vlahuță, Ion Luca Caragiale, Constantin Stere, Constantin Dobrogeanu-Gherea, and Radu Rosetti, protested against the violent intervention of the forces of repression. Others emphasized that the government had a special responsibility for the fate of the peasantry and the country in general, and therefore an urgent solution to the "peasant question" was required.

The Liberal government began a campaign to repress any kind of political organization of the peasants. Many teachers, priests and other countryside intellectuals were arrested, as were pro-universal suffrage activists Vasile M. Kogălniceanu and Alexandru Vălescu, who were regarded as instigators of the revolt.

The government also began enacting a series of reforms in order to provide some relief to the peasantry, but without expropriating the landlords. The December 23, 1907 law on agricultural contracts limited the degree to which the peasants could be exploited by the landlords and lessors: it set maximum prices for land leases, it set minimum wages for peasants working on landlords' estates and it established Casa Rurală, a bank which was supposed to help peasants to buy lots of 5 hectares (12 acres) from landlords. A law passed on April 12, 1908 banned anyone leasing more than 4,000 ha (9,900 acres) at one time.

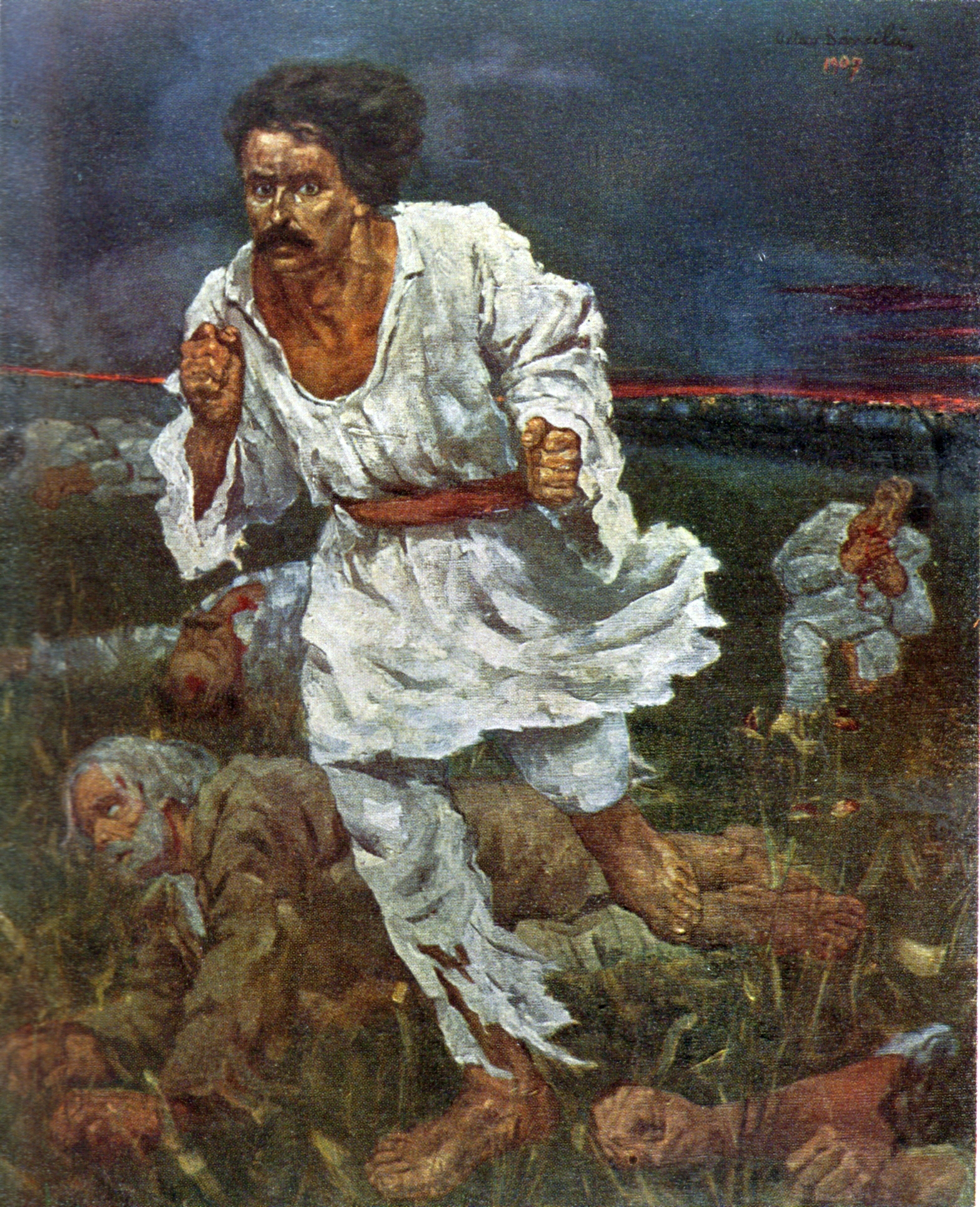
Octav Băncilă's iconic "1907" painting

== Legacy ==
The events continued to resonate in the Romanian conscience, and were the subject of one of the novels of the interwar period, Răscoala ("The Revolt"), by Liviu Rebreanu, published in 1932. A film based on the book, Răscoala, was produced in 1965. The revolt also formed the subject of a painting by Octav Băncilă, and of a monumental statue which can still be seen in Bucharest.
