= Ocnița (disambiguation) =

Ocnița is the seat of Ocnița district, Moldova.

Ocnița may also refer to:

== Places in Romania ==
- Ocnița, Dâmbovița, Dâmboviţa County, Romania
- Ocnița, a village in Teaca Commune, Bistrița-Năsăud County, Romania
- Ocnița, a village in Ocnele Mari town, Vâlcea County, Romania

== Places in Moldova ==
- Ocnița district, Moldova
- Ocnița, Ocnița, a commune in Ocnița district, Moldova
- Ocnița, Transnistria, a commune in Transnistria, Moldova
- Ocnița-Răzeși, a village in Cucuruzeni Commune, Orhei district, Moldova
- Ocnița-Țărani, a village in Zorile Commune, Orhei district, Moldova
