= Giurgiu Clocktower =

- Turnul Ceasornicului din Giurgiu (Romanian)
- Yergöğü Saat Külesi
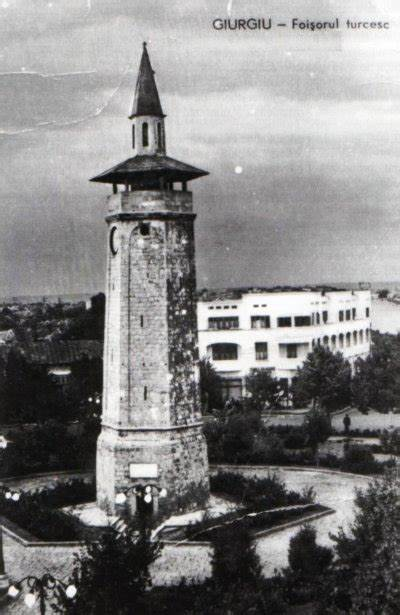
- Historic image of Giurgiu Clocktower

- Giurgiu Clocktower
- 43°53′25″N 25°57′54″E
- Location: Giurgiu County, Romania
- Nearest city: Giurgiu

History
- Built: 1771
- Built for: Ottoman military
- Original use: Military watchtower, then fire tower

Site notes
- Architectural style: Ottoman architecture
- Restored: 2007
- Current use: Clocktower
- Governing body: Ministry of Culture and National Patrimony (Romania)

Monument istoric
- Type: Architectural Monument of National Interest
- Designated: 2004
- Part of: National Register of Historic Monuments (Romanian: Lista Monumentelor Istorice (LMI))
- Reference no.: GR-II-m-A-14913

The Giurgiu Clocktower (Romanian: Turnul Ceasornicului; Turkish: Yergöğü Saat Külesi) is an Ottoman watchtower (1771), later fire lookout and clocktower (1830) from the Romanian town of Giurgiu. It has been designated by the Romanian Ministry of Culture and National Heritage as a historical monument of national importance. The city of Giurgiu is located on the Danube river, which constitutes the border with Bulgaria. The city's location on the river made it a strategic asset for the Ottoman Empire. The Ottomans started construction of the tower in 1770 and completed construction in 1771. It was initially built as a military watchtower used for surveillance over the city and the river, and was later used as a lookout for fire prevention.

The monument is the symbol of the City of Giurgiu as well as a symbol of Giurgiu County and depicted as such on the official county emblem.

== Description ==
The watchtower is slightly inclined and has a height of 22 meters, aspects that make it unique in south-east Europe.

== History ==
=== Watchtower ===
The Ottomans began construction on the tower in 1770, in the era of the Russo-Austro-Turkish wars (see Russo-Turkish wars and Austro-Turkish War (1788–1791)), during which it was used as a military observation point. Unfortunately, there is no founding document to officially attest to its construction. It was built following the plans of an unknown European engineer, according to the military style of the era. Over the years, there has been local speculation that the tower might have been built by the Genovese founders of the city, others have speculated that its original purpose was as a minaret and part of a mosque complex. Researchers at the Teohari Antonescu Archeological Museum have debunked these speculations as false, with documentary evidence indicating that the tower was meant to help the Ottomans with their surveillance and patrol capabilities of the Danube. Similar towers were built in cities now part of modern Bulgaria, Albania, and Serbia. The majority of those were destroyed - either demolished by the locals or ruined during the independence wars of those nations against the Ottoman Empire.

=== Clocktower ===
After the Ottoman Empire retreated from Romanian territory, the watchtower underwent several modifications. In 1830 a clock was added to the tower, giving it its present general appearance. Its architecture was modified several times, especially in an attempt to repair various damage produced by the constant wars of the 19th century. Modifications began in 1830 and continued up to the First World War. During World War I, a large portion of Giurgiu was destroyed by a fire, including the upper floors of the tower.

The clock's mechanism was replaced several times, with the original one, rediscovered in 2005, now being housed by the Teohari Antonescu History Museum in Giurgiu. An interesting aspect regarding the tower is its hexagonal plan that surrounds the base which, in the 19th century served as a home to municipal firefighters, police, and town hall. Teohari Antonescu Museum curator Mircea Alexa talks about the roles of the tower before 1906, stating that "the firemen were hosted in the rooms of the tallest building in the city. ... When the clock was put in place, part of the tower was cut to make room for the clock and the mechanism. Initially, the clock worked as a bell - a town hall official pulled the bell to rally municipal meetings, this providing a very important municipal function."

=== Landmark of modern Giurgiu ===
As Giurgiu expanded and developed, urban plans included the Clocktower as the central point of the city. According to Emil Păunescu, the director of the county museum, Austrian engineer Moritz von Ott, the author of the first official city plans which date back to 1832, was the first one to include the tower in his urban development plan. Păunescu notices that the 1832 plan is based on the same concept as the one designed, also by von Ott, for the city of Brăila. A characteristic of the plan is that it placed a circular square in Giurgiu's town centre, which locals then used to call farfuria cu tei, "the saucer with linden trees" due to its shape. That is where the main town promenade was located.

After Romania entered World War I in 1916, Giurgiu was mostly destroyed. Bucharest and the southern part of Romania were occupied. The Germans had the command, but the majority of those stationed in the vicinity and in Giurgiu were Bulgarians. The troops were extremely violent, retaliating on the locals of Giurgiu for their role in the 1913 Second Balkan War, which saw the Romanian occupation of Southern Dobruja. The Bulgarian troops encountered no resistance and there was no street fighting. However, after the troops entered the town, they set it on fire, which also affected the tower, and killing most of the people in their path. As a result, in 1918, when the Bulgarians left, more than half of Giurgiu had been razed.

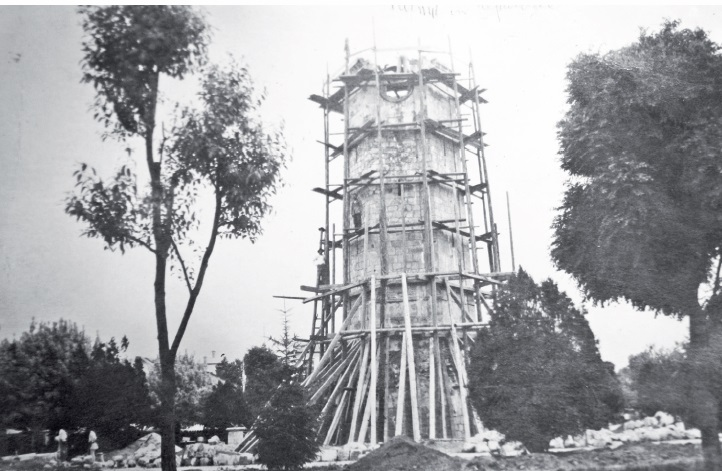
Clocktower after World War I

The tower was subsequently renovated, only to be left without a roof again in 1932. After the economic crisis was over, the renovation was entrusted to the architect Horia Teodoru who completed another renovation in 1934. The building surrounding the base of the tower was however not rebuilt by Teodoru.

At 22 m high, the tower remained the tallest building in the city until the communist era, when a new apartment building surpassed it in height.

After the Romanian Revolution, representatives of the “Teohari Antonescu” Museum requested from the local authorities the permission to assess and examine the tower. The assessment was completed in 1996. A new series of renovations began in 2001 and ended in 2007. The focus of this last renovation was consolidating the foundation of the tower, strengthening the structure by reinforcing it with concrete and, yet again, rebuilding its upper part.

== Legend of the tunnels ==
Local legends purport that there are several tunnels beneath the clocktower. These tunnels were said to start at the base of the tower and continue to the old city walls. Inspired by these legends, researchers and archseologists from the local community were interested in excavating around the tower. Researcher Mircea Alexa talks about how they wanted to verify these legends and took advantage of the renovations in the early 2000s. They obtained the approval to dig around the base of the tower. Colonel Dan Căpățâna, an archaeologist and former department head at the Military Museum, was also present. The legends were debunked during the 2001-2007 renovation and restoration works, as the excavations didn't unearth any tunnels.

== Discovery of the original clock mechanism ==
The initial disappointment quickly dissipated when workers stumbled across the clock's original mechanism in 2005. Workers initially planned on discarding the mechanism thinking it was rubbish. After a closer look, local researchers assessed it to be the original mechanism of the clocktower. The gong alone weighed more than 50 kg.

== Influence on local architecture ==
The clocktower influenced the layout of modern Giurgiu by urban planners into a star shaped organizational layout, drawing inspiration from Paris. The “étoile” system was introduced around 1877 as the city expanded. The clocktower was considered the center of the star and all main streets have their starting point at the tower's promenade and extend to the rest of the city, creating the star shape. The first area surrounding the tower was known as Carol I Square, renamed to Carol II Square, and currently Unification Square which includes the promenade. The squares were surrounded by parking for vehicles and the promenade was lined with shops.

Each arm of the "star" layout was a principal neighborhood, identified in municipal plans by specific colors. Therefore, each arm of the city was a different color on city schemata. According to historic urban plans, there were five colors: red, yellow, blue, green, and black. The black color, for instance, corresponded to the old village Smarda, which is now a part of the city, while green was for a neighborhood where both Romanians and Bulgarians lived.

After 1960, the communist regime slowly destroyed the historic urban planner's vision for the city and its star layout by building soviet-style apartment blocks throughout Giurgiu. The communist government planned to build apartment blocks to form a rectangle around the tower and even considered physically relocating the clocktower. These were never realized. However, a soviet-style apartment block from the communist period named "Eva" became the new tallest construction in the City of Giurgiu.

Today, the tower is a local tourist attraction and can be visited any time. The main area around the tower was rebuilt according to the historic plans. The space surrounding the tower was leased and many coffee shops and restaurants were built there. Locals consider the rebuilt area as kitsch and lacking the beauty of the old square. They believe that modern buildings with shops and restaurants should not have been built near the historical monument. After a number of protests by local citizens in the 2000s, the square surrounding the tower was not extended any further.
