= Băneasa, Giurgiu =

Băneasa
- Commune
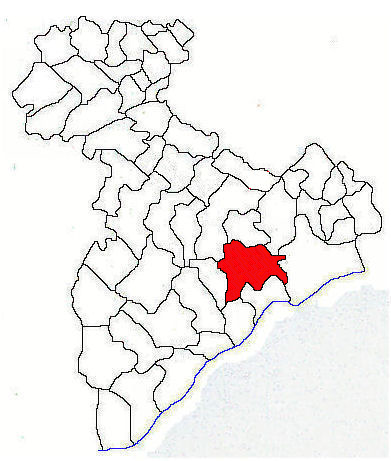
- Location in Giurgiu County

- Location in Romania
- Coordinates: 44°03′N 26°05′E
- Country: Romania
- County: Giurgiu

Government
  - Mayor (2024–2028): Ion-Viorel Rotaru (PNL)
- Area: 110.97 km^{2} (42.85 sq mi)
- Elevation: 92 m (302 ft)
- Population (2021-12-01): 4,601
  - Density: 41/km^{2} (110/sq mi)
- Time zone: EET/EEST (UTC+2/+3)
- Postal code: 87010
- Area code: +(40) 246
- Vehicle reg.: GR
- Website: www.primariabaneasagr.ro

Băneasa is a commune located in Giurgiu County, Muntenia, Romania. It is composed of four villages: Băneasa, Frasinu, Pietrele, and Sfântu Gheorghe.

Historical population
Year	Pop.	±%
2002	5,674	—
2011	5,227	−7.9%
2021	4,601	−12.0%
Source: Census data
