= Hotarele =

- Commune
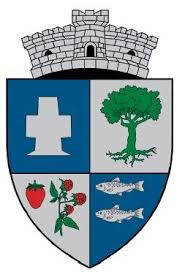
- Coat of arms

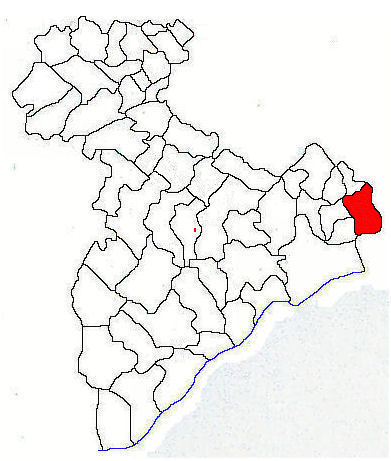
- Location in Giurgiu County

- Location in Romania
- Coordinates: 44°11′N 26°22′E
- Country: Romania
- County: Giurgiu

Government
  - Mayor (2024–2028): Silvian Manea (PNL)
- Area: 50.09 km^{2} (19.34 sq mi)
- Elevation: 38 m (125 ft)
- Population (2021-12-01): 3,352
  - Density: 67/km^{2} (170/sq mi)
- Time zone: EET/EEST (UTC+2/+3)
- Postal code: 087125
- Area code: +(40) 246
- Vehicle reg.: GR
- Website: comunahotarele.ro

Hotarele is a commune located in Giurgiu County, Muntenia, Romania. It is composed of a single village, Hotarele. Until 2004, it included Isvoarele, Teiușu, Herăști, and Miloșești villages; the first two were split off that year to form Isvoarele Commune, and the second two to form Herăști Commune.

Historical population
Year	Pop.	±%
2002	4,497	—
2011	3,939	−12.4%
2021	3,352	−14.9%
Source: Census data
