= Gostinu =

Costinu
- Commune
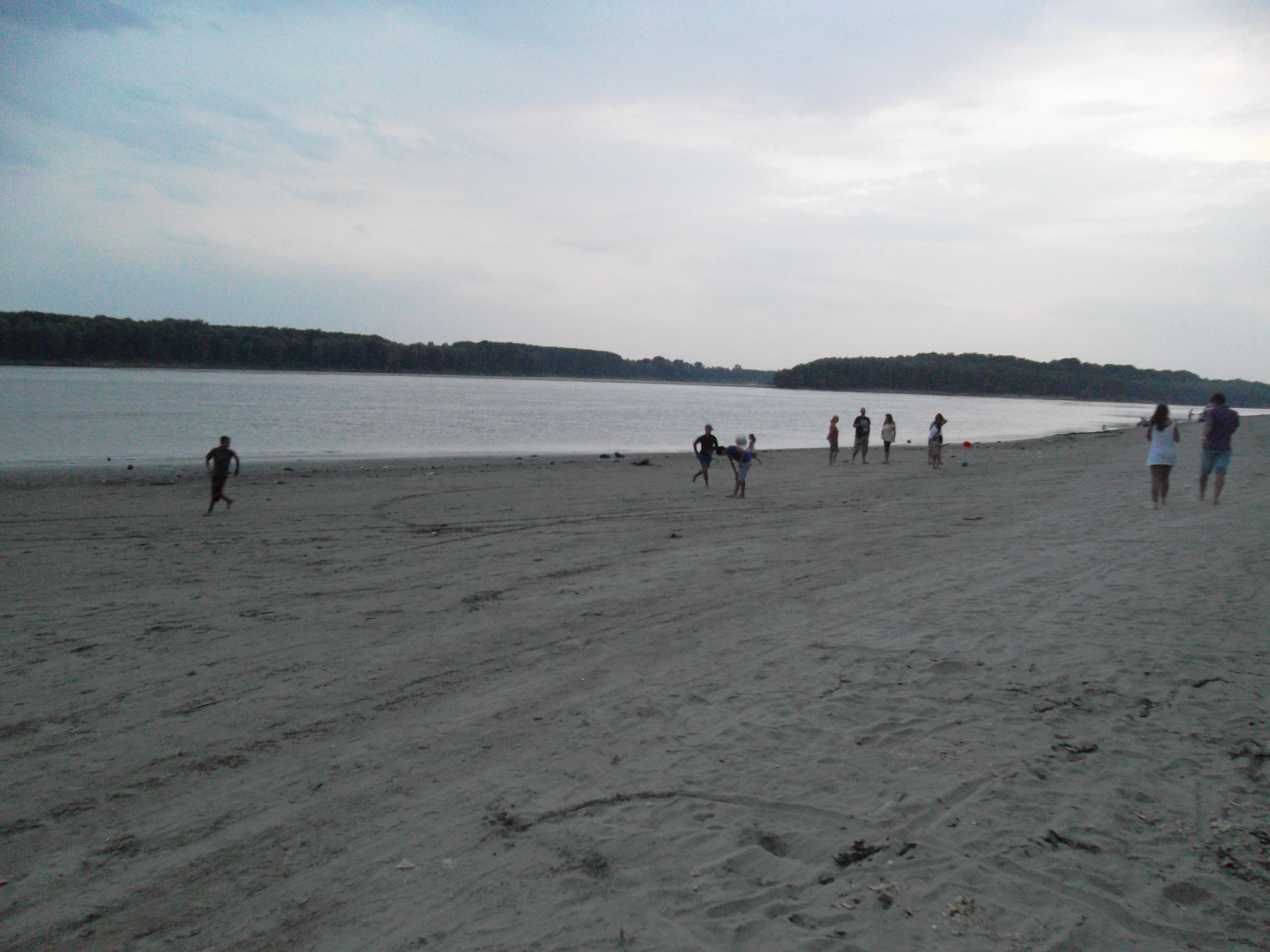
- The Danube at Gostinu

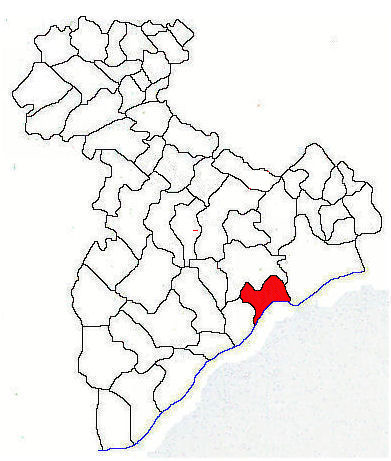
- Location in Giurgiu County

- Location in Romania
- Coordinates: 44°0′N 26°7′E
- Country: Romania
- County: Giurgiu

Government
  - Mayor (2020–2024): Dumitru Văcaru (PNL)
- Area: 39.26 km^{2} (15.16 sq mi)
- Elevation: 20 m (66 ft)
- Population (2021-12-01): 1,578
  - Density: 40.19/km^{2} (104.1/sq mi)
- Time zone: UTC+02:00 (EET)
  - Summer (DST): UTC+03:00 (EEST)
- Postal code: 087110
- Area code: +(40) 246
- Vehicle reg.: GR

Gostinu is a commune located in Giurgiu County, Muntenia, Romania. It is composed of a single village, Gostinu.

Historical population
Year	Pop.	±%
2002	2,419	—
2011	2,032	−16.0%
2021	1,578	−22.3%
Source: Census data
