= Cosoba =

- Commune
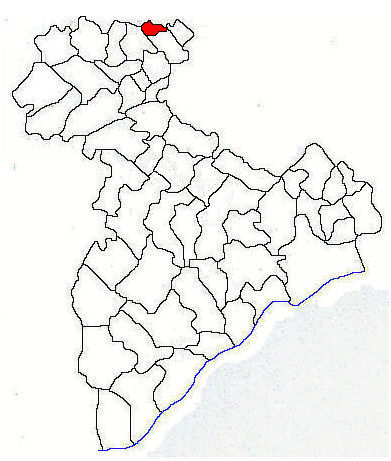
- Location in Giurgiu County

- Location in Romania
- Coordinates: 44°31′21″N 25°49′04″E
- Country: Romania
- County: Giurgiu

Government
  - Mayor (2024–2028): Carmen Gabriel Lixandru (PNL)
- Area: 14.64 km^{2} (5.65 sq mi)
- Elevation: 112 m (367 ft)
- Population (2021-12-01): 2,767
  - Density: 190/km^{2} (490/sq mi)
- Time zone: EET/EEST (UTC+2/+3)
- Postal code: 087152
- Area code: +(40) 246
- Vehicle reg.: GR
- Website: comunacosoba.ro

Cosoba is a commune located in Giurgiu County, Muntenia, Romania. It is composed of a single village, Cosoba.

Historical population
Year	Pop.	±%
2002	2,566	—
2011	2,611	+1.8%
2021	2,767	+6.0%
Source: Census data
