= Ciorogârla (river) =

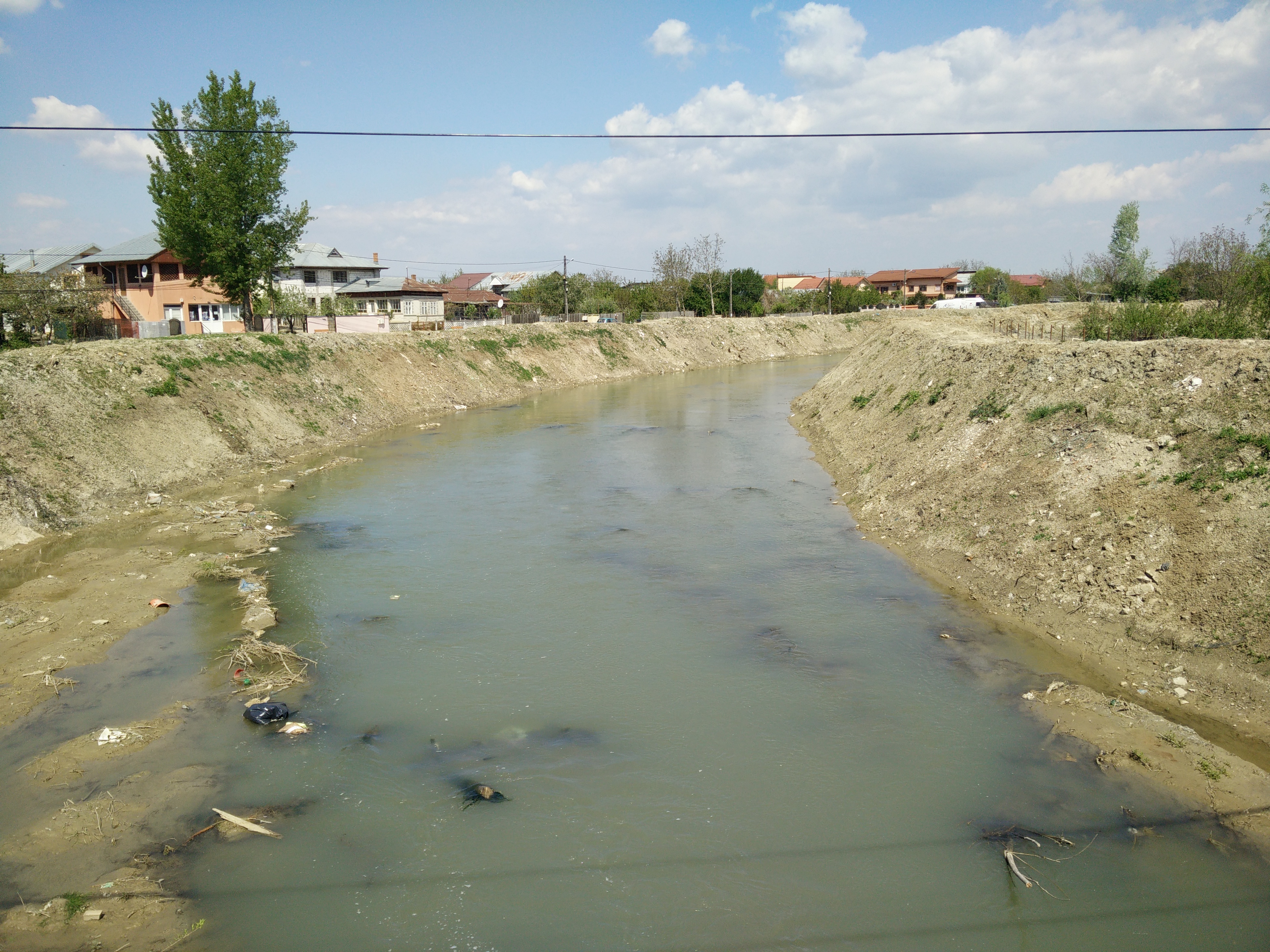
- Ciorogârla in Domnești

- Location within Romania

Location
- Country: Romania
- Counties: Giurgiu, Ilfov
- Villages: Ciorogârla, Bragadiru, Măgurele

Physical characteristics
- Mouth: Sabar
  - location: Jilava
  - coordinates: 44.3333°N 26.0519°E
- Length: 57 km (35 mi)
- Basin size: 149 km^{2} (58 sq mi)

Basin features
- Progression: Sabar→ Argeș→ Danube→ Black Sea

The Ciorogârla is a left tributary of the river Sabar in Romania. It discharges into the Sabar in Jilava. Its length is 57 km (35 mi) and its basin size is 149 km^{2} (58 sq mi). For the flood protection of the city of Bucharest the floods of the Dâmbovița are diverted at Brezoaele into the Ciorogârla.
