= Mihai Bravu, Giurgiu =

Mihai Bravu
- Commune
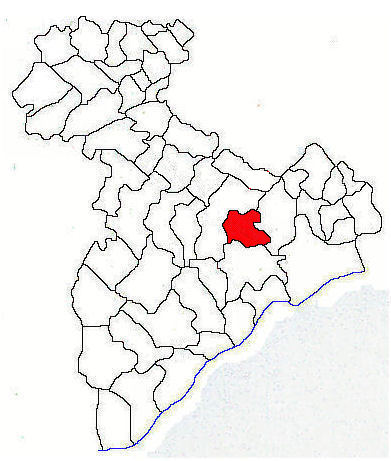
- Location in Giurgiu County

- Location in Romania
- Coordinates: 44°9′N 26°4′E
- Country: Romania
- County: Giurgiu

Government
  - Mayor (2020–2024): Ion Nițu (PNL)
- Area: 66.54 km^{2} (25.69 sq mi)
- Elevation: 81 m (266 ft)
- Population (2021-12-01): 2,335
  - Density: 35.09/km^{2} (90.89/sq mi)
- Time zone: EET/EEST (UTC+2/+3)
- Postal code: 087165
- Area code: +(40) 246
- Vehicle reg.: GR
- Website: primariamihaibravu.ro

Mihai Bravu is a commune located in Giurgiu County, Muntenia, Romania. It is composed of a single village, Mihai Bravu.

Historical population
Year	Pop.	±%
2002	2,758	—
2011	2,586	−6.2%
2021	2,335	−9.7%
Source: Census data
