= Greaca =

- Commune
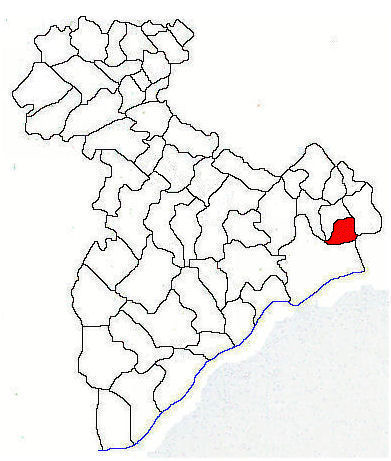
- Location in Giurgiu County

- Location in Romania
- Coordinates: 44°06′33″N 26°20′12″E
- Country: Romania
- County: Giurgiu

Government
  - Mayor (2020–2024): Florentin-Mihai Surduleasa (PSD)
- Area: 27.27 km^{2} (10.53 sq mi)
- Elevation: 73 m (240 ft)
- Population (2021-12-01): 2,148
  - Density: 79/km^{2} (200/sq mi)
- Time zone: EET/EEST (UTC+2/+3)
- Postal code: 87120
- Area code: +(40) 246
- Vehicle reg.: GR
- Website: www.primariagreaca.ro

Greaca is a commune located in Giurgiu County, Muntenia, Romania. It is composed of three villages: Greaca, Puțu Greci, and Zboiu.

The commune is located in the southeastern extremity of the county, on the left bank of the Danube, on the border with Călărași County and on the border with the Ruse and Silistra Province provinces of Bulgaria. It is crossed by the DN41 national road, which connects the county seat, Giurgiu, to Oltenița.

Historical population
Year	Pop.	±%
2002	2,843	—
2011	2,543	−10.6%
2021	2,148	−15.5%
Source: Census data
