= List of Romanian counties by population =

List of Romanian counties by population presents the evolution of the resident population, by county, between 1948 and 2021. The table is ordered alphabetically, but can be sorted according to the results of each census. The National Institute of Statistics in Romania considered the following reference dates:

- 25 January 1948
- February 21, 1956
- March 15, 1966
- January 5, 1977
- January 7, 1992 (Note: The 1992 census was the first population census that took place in Romania after the fall of the communist regime (Dec. 1989))
- March 18, 2002 (Note: The 2002 census was carried out by the National Institute of Statistics in Romania, between March 18 and 27, 2002)
- October 20, 2011
- December 1, 2021

In each cell of the table, the number of the population and the demographic growth rate compared to the previous census are shown. The last column shows the population growth rate in the period 1948-2021.

Județ	Census population of:								1948- 2021
Județ	1948	1956	1966	1977	1992	2002	2011	2021	1948- 2021
Alba	361,062 ―	370,800; 2.70% ▲	382,786; 3.23% ▲	409,634; 7.01% ▲	414,227; 1.05% ▲	382,747 −7.53% ▼	342,336 −10.55% ▼	325,941 −4,80% ▼	−9.73% ▼
Arad	476,207 ―	475,620 −0.12% ▼	481,248; 1.18% ▲	512,020; 6.39% ▲	487,370 −4.77% ▼	461,791 −5.30% ▼	412,235 −6.75% ▼	410,143 −4.76% ▼	−13.87% ▼
Argeș	448,964 ―	483,741; 7.75% ▲	529,833; 9.53% ▲	631,918; 19.27% ▲	680,574; 7.80% ▲	652,625 −4.20% ▼	612,431 −6.16% ▼	569,932 −6.94% ▼	26.94% ▲
Bacău	414,996 ―	507,937; 22.40% ▲	598,321; 17.79% ▲	667,791; 11.61% ▲	736,078; 10.44% ▲	706,623 −4.19% ▼	616,168 −12.8% ▼	601,387 −2.40% ▼	44.91% ▲
Bihor	536,323 ―	574,488; 7.12% ▲	586,460; 2.08% ▲	633,094; 7.95% ▲	634,093; 0.91% ▲	600,246 −6.04% ▼	575,398 −4.14% ▼	551,297 −4.19% ▼	2.79% ▲
Bistrița-Năsăud	233,650 ―	255,789; 9.48% ▲	269,954; 5.54% ▲	286,628; 6.18% ▲	327,238; 14.02% ▲	311,657 −4.64% ▼	301,425 −8.16% ▼	295,988; 3.41% ▲	26.68% ▲
Botoșani	385,236 ―	428,050; 11.11% ▲	452,406; 5.69% ▲	451,217 −0.26% ▼	458,904; 2.24% ▲	452,834 −1.84% ▼	404,429 −8.88% ▼	392,821 −4.80% ▼	1.97% ▲
Brașov	300,836 ―	373,941; 24.30% ▲	442,692; 18.39% ▲	582,863; 31.66% ▲	642,513; 10.36% ▲	589,028 −8.43% ▼	549,906 −6.76% ▼	546,615 −0.47% ▼	81.70% ▲
Brăila	271,251 ―	297,276; 9.59% ▲	339,954; 14.36% ▲	377,954; 11.18% ▲	392,069; 3.72% ▲	373,174 −4.81% ▼	316,652 −13.92% ▼	281,452 −12.38% ▼	3.76% ▲
Buzău	430,225 ―	465,829; 8.28% ▲	480,951; 3.25% ▲	508,424; 5.71% ▲	516,307; 1.68% ▲	496,214 −4.01% ▼	440,347 −9.10% ▼	404,979 −10.22% ▼	−5.87% ▼
Caraș-Severin	302,254 ―	327,787; 8.45% ▲	358,726; 9.44% ▲	385,577; 7.49% ▲	375,794 −2.39% ▼	333,219 −11.46% ▼	287,535 −11.30% ▼	246,588 −16.57% ▼	−18.42% ▼
Călărași	287,722 ―	318,573; 10.72% ▲	337,261; 5.87% ▲	338,807; 0.46% ▲	338,844; 0.00% ▲	324,617 −4.19% ▼	287,269 −5.52% ▼	283,458 −7.58% ▼	−1.48% ▼
Cluj	520,073 ―	580,344; 11.59% ▲	629,746; 8.51% ▲	715,507; 13.62% ▲	735,077; 2.91% ▲	702,755 −4.56% ▼	691,106 −1.66% ▼	679,141 −1.73% ▼	30.59% ▲
Constanța	311,062 ―	369,940; 18.93% ▲	465,752; 25.90% ▲	608,817; 30.72% ▲	748,044; 22.99% ▲	715,151 −4.49% ▼	684,082 −4.34% ▼	655,997 −4.11% ▼	110.89% ▲
Covasna	157,166 ―	172,509; 9.76% ▲	176,858; 2.52% ▲	199,017; 12.53% ▲	232,592; 17.20% ▲	222,449 −4.63% ▼	211,254 −5.52% ▼	200,042 −4.82% ▼	27.28% ▲
Dâmbovița	409,272 ―	438,985; 7.26% ▲	453,241; 3.25% ▲	527,620; 16.41% ▲	559,874; 6.52% ▲	541,763 −3.61% ▼	510,287 −4.25% ▼	479,404 −7.58% ▼	17.14% ▲
Dolj	615,301 ―	642,028; 4.34% ▲	691,116; 7.65% ▲	750,328; 8.57% ▲	761,074; 1.57% ▲	734,231 −3.66% ▼	660,544 −10.04% ▼	599,442 −9.25% ▼	−2.58% ▼
Galați	341,797 ―	396,138; 15.90% ▲	474,279; 19.73% ▲	581,561; 22.62% ▲	639,853; 10.22% ▲	619,556 −3.35% ▼	530,612 −13.46% ▼	496,892 −7.33% ▼	45.38% ▲
Giurgiu	313,793 ―	325,045; 3.59% ▲	320,120 −1.52% ▼	327,494; 2.30% ▲	313,084 −4.32% ▼	297,859 −4.94% ▼	267,147 −5.52% ▼	262,066 −6.88% ▼	−16.48% ▼
Gorj	280,524 ―	293,031; 4.46% ▲	298,382; 1.83% ▲	348,521; 16.80% ▲	400,100; 15.06% ▲	387,308 −3.42% ▼	345,771 −11.80% ▼	314,684 −7.88% ▼	12.18% ▲
Harghita	258,495 ―	273,964; 5.98% ▲	282,392; 3.08% ▲	326,310; 15.55% ▲	347,637; 6.75% ▲	326,222 −6.35% ▼	304,765 −4.71% ▼	291,950 −6.09% ▼	12.94% ▲
Hunedoara	306,955 ―	381,902; 24.42% ▲	474,602; 24.27% ▲	514,436; 8.39% ▲	547,993; 6.51% ▲	485,712 −11.36% ▼	410,383 −13.82 ▼	361,657 −13.60% ▼	17.82% ▲
Ialomița	244,750 ―	274,655; 12.22% ▲	291,373; 6.09% ▲	295,965; 1.58% ▲	304,008; 3.44% ▲	296,572 −3.13% ▼	265,559 −7.56% ▼	250,816 −8.51% ▼	2.48% ▲
Iași	431,586 ―	516,635; 19.71% ▲	619,027; 19.82% ▲	729,243; 17.80% ▲	806,778; 11.26% ▲	816,910; 0.69% ▲	772,348 −5.45% ▼	760,774 −1.50% ▼	76.27% ▲
Ilfov	167,533 ―	196,265; 17.15% ▲	229,773; 17.07% ▲	287,738; 25.23% ▲	286,939 −0.27% ▼	300,123; 4.59% ▲	353,481; 29.53% ▲	542,686; 39.61% ▲	223.94% ▲
Maramureș	321,287 ―	367,114; 14.26% ▲	427,645; 16.49% ▲	492,860; 15.25% ▲	538,534; 9.58% ▲	510,110 −5.55% ▼	472,117 −6.17% ▼	452,475 −5.47% ▼	40.83% ▲
Mehedinți	304,788 ―	304,091 −0.23% ▼	310,021; 1.95% ▲	322,371; 3.98% ▲	332,091; 3.20% ▲	306,732 −7.80% ▼	259,212 −13.48% ▼	234,339 −11.70% ▼	−23.11% ▼
Mureș	461,403 ―	513,261; 11.24% ▲	561,598; 9.42% ▲	605,345; 7.79% ▲	607,298; 0.78% ▲	580,851 −4.79% ▼	540,508 −5.17% ▼	518,193 −5.93% ▼	12.31% ▲
Neamț	357,348 ―	419,949; 17.52% ▲	470,206; 11.97% ▲	532,096; 13.16% ▲	577,190; 8.71% ▲	554,516 −4.13% ▼	507,399 −15.10% ▼	454,203 −3.52% ▼	27.10% ▲
Olt	442,442 ―	458,982; 3.74% ▲	476,513; 3.82% ▲	518,804; 8.88% ▲	520,966; 0.86% ▲	489,274 −6.50% ▼	421,769 −10.81% ▼	383,280 −12.17% ▼	−13.37% ▼
Prahova	557,776 ―	623,817; 11.84% ▲	701,057; 12.38% ▲	817,168; 16.56% ▲	873,229; 7.00% ▲	829,945 −5.08% ▼	762,886 −8.08% ▼	695,117 −8.88% ▼	24.62% ▲
Satu Mare	312,672 ―	337,351; 7.89% ▲	359,393; 6.53% ▲	393,840; 9.58% ▲	400,158; 1.76% ▲	367,281 −8.36% ▼	336,117 −6.24% ▼	330,668 −3.98% ▼	5.76% ▲
Sălaj	262,580 ―	271,989; 3.58% ▲	263,103 −3.27% ▼	264,569; 0.56% ▲	266,308; 0.84% ▲	248,015 −7.04% ▼	225,631 −9.53% ▼	212,224 −5.42% ▼	−19.18% ▼
Sibiu	335,116 ―	372,687; 11.21% ▲	414,756; 11.29% ▲	481,645; 16.13% ▲	452,820 −5.97% ▼	421,724 −6.88% ▼	377,273 −5.79% ▼	388,325 −2.26% ▼	15.88% ▲
Suceava	439,751 ―	507,674; 15.45% ▲	572,781; 12.82% ▲	633,899; 10.67% ▲	700,799; 10.72% ▲	688,435 −1.91% ▼	634,810 −7.79% ▼	642,551; 1.22% ▲	46.12% ▲
Teleorman	487,394 ―	510,488; 4.74% ▲	516,222; 1.12% ▲	518,943; 0.53% ▲	482,281 −6.76% ▼	436,025 −9.88% ▼	369,897 −12.82% ▼	323,544 −14.88% ▼	−33.62% ▼
Timiș	588,936 ―	568,881 −3.41% ▼	607,596; 6.81% ▲	696,884; 14.70% ▲	700,292; 0.45% ▲	677,926 −3.16% ▼	683,540; 0.83% ▲	650,533 −4.83% ▼	10.46% ▲
Tulcea	192,228 ―	223,719; 16.38% ▲	236,709; 5.81% ▲	254,531; 7.53% ▲	270,197; 6.47% ▲	256,492 −5.35% ▼	211,622 −16.92% ▼	193,355 −9.26% ▼	0.59% ▲
Vaslui	344,917 ―	401,626; 16.44% ▲	431,555; 7.45% ▲	437,251; 1.32% ▲	457,799; 5.52% ▲	455,049 −1.37% ▼	393,340 −13.09% ▼	374,700 −5.26% ▼	8.63% ▲
Vâlcea	341,590 ―	362,356; 6.08% ▲	368,779; 1.77% ▲	414,241; 12.33% ▲	436,298; 5.83% ▲	413,247 −5.73% ▼	374,240 −10.05% ▼	335,312 −8.03% ▼	0.08% ▲
Vrancea	290,183 ―	326,532; 12.53% ▲	351,292; 7.58% ▲	369,740; 5.25% ▲	392,651; 6.40% ▲	387,632 −1.47% ▼	339,510 −12.21% ▼	341,861 −1.47% ▼	15.55% ▲
Municipiul București	1,025,180 ―	1,177,661; 14.87% ▲	1,366,684; 16.05% ▲	1,807,239; 32.24% ▲	2,067,545; 14.40% ▲	1,926,334 −6.83% ▼	1,883,425 −2.23% ▼	1,716,961 −8.84% ▼	67.48% ▲
Romania	15,872,624 ―	17,489,450; 10.19% ▲	19,103,163; 9.23% ▲	21,559,910; 12.86% ▲	22,760,449; 5.80% ▲	21,680,974 −4.95% ▼	19,599,506 −7.19% ▼	19,053,815 −5.31% ▼	20.04% ▲

== See also ==
- RPL2021 - 2021 Romanian census
- List of Romanian Counties by Area
