= Gogoșari =

- Commune
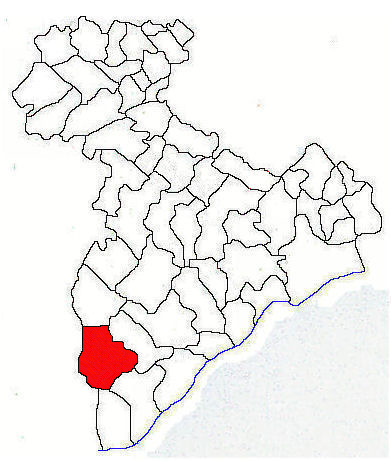
- Location in Giurgiu County

- Location in Romania
- Coordinates: 43°52′N 25°42′E
- Country: Romania
- County: Giurgiu

Government
  - Mayor (2020–2024): Dănuț Daia (PNL)
- Area: 120.68 km^{2} (46.59 sq mi)
- Elevation: 75 m (246 ft)
- Population (2021-12-01): 1,607
  - Density: 13/km^{2} (34/sq mi)
- Time zone: EET/EEST (UTC+2/+3)
- Postal code: 087100
- Area code: +(40) 246
- Vehicle reg.: GR
- Website: www.primariagogosari.ro

Gogoșari is a commune located in Giurgiu County, Muntenia, Romania. It is composed of four villages: Drăghiceanu, Gogoșari, Izvoru, and Rălești.

Historical population
Year	Pop.	±%
2002	2,279	—
2011	1,975	−13.3%
2021	1,607	−18.6%
Source: Census data
