= Democrația =

- Type: Weekly newspaper
- Founder: The European Institute for Political Studies in Moldova
- Editor-in-chief: Ala Mândâcanu (2001–2004), Cornel Ciurea (2006–2009)
- Founded: December 2001
- Ceased publication: April 5, 2009
- Political alignment: It was close to the Social Liberal Party (Moldova)
- Language: Romanian
- Headquarters: Chişinău
- Circulation: 3,500 (February 2008)

Democrația (Romanian for "Democracy") was a weekly newspaper from the Republic of Moldova, published between December 2001 and April 5, 2009. The editors in chief were Ala Mândâcanu (2001–2004) and Cornel Ciurea (2006–2009). The weekly newspaper was close to the Social Liberal Party (Moldova), Cornel Ciurea was serving as a deputy president of the party.
