= Gostinari =

- Commune
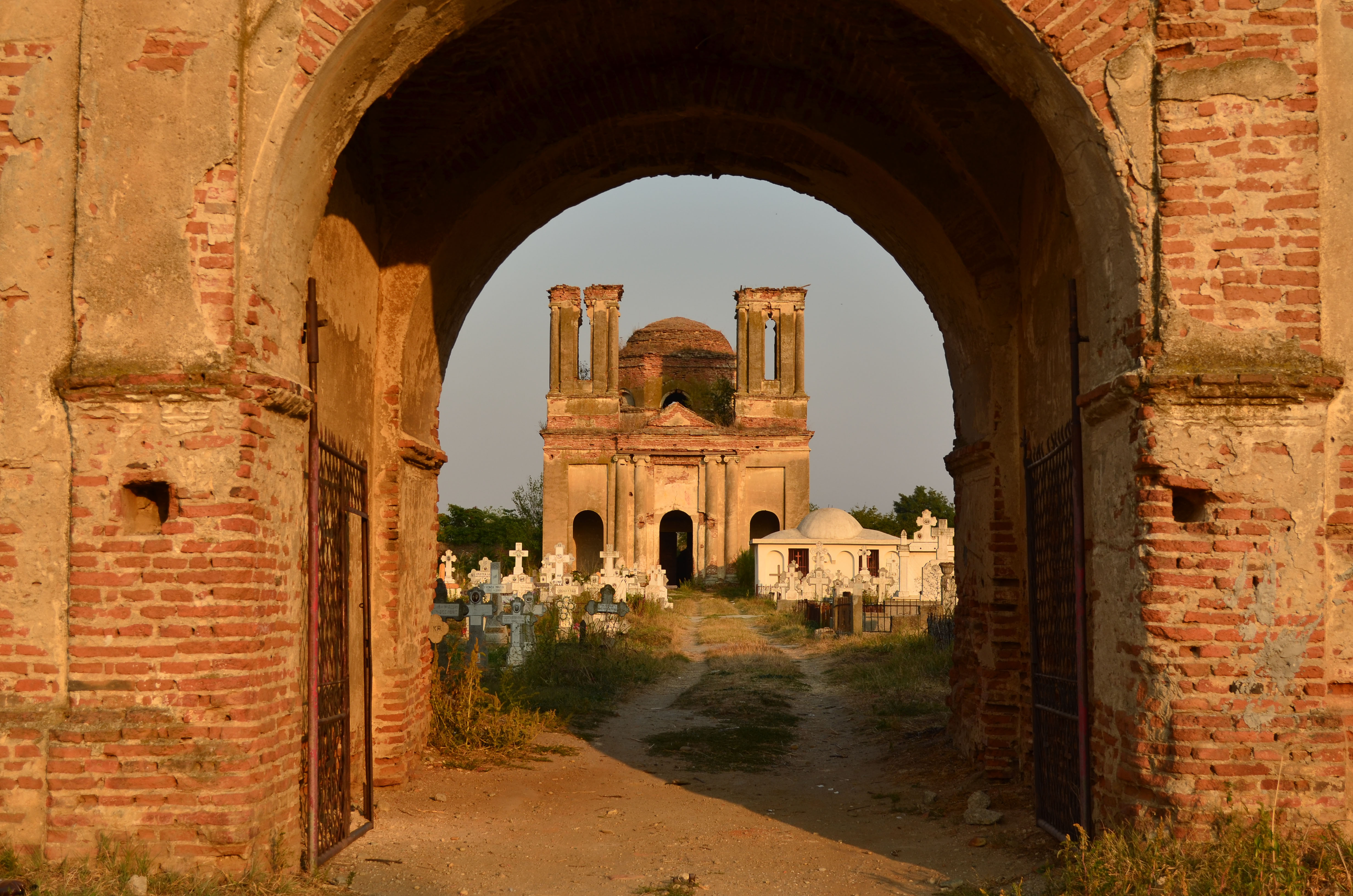
- Saint Nicholas' church in Gostinari

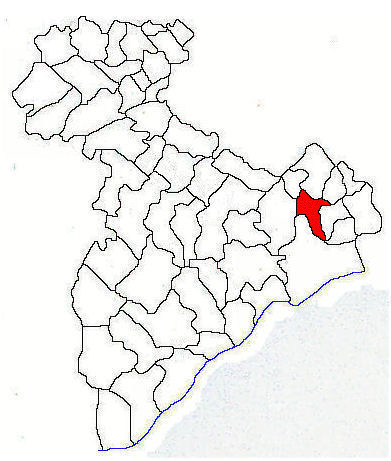
- Location in Giurgiu County

- Location in Romania
- Coordinates: 44°11′N 26°14′E
- Country: Romania
- County: Giurgiu

Government
  - Mayor (2024–2028): Ion Marin (PSD)
- Area: 36.02 km^{2} (13.91 sq mi)
- Elevation: 44 m (144 ft)
- Population (2021-12-01): 2,403
  - Density: 66.71/km^{2} (172.8/sq mi)
- Time zone: UTC+02:00 (EET)
  - Summer (DST): UTC+03:00 (EEST)
- Postal code: 87105
- Area code: +(40) 246
- Vehicle reg.: GR
- Website: www.comunagostinari.ro

Gostinari is a commune located in Giurgiu County, Muntenia, Romania. It is composed of two villages, Gostinari and Mironești.

Historical population
Year	Pop.	±%
2002	2,775	—
2011	2,634	−5.1%
2021	2,403	−8.8%
Source: Census data
