= Grădinari, Giurgiu =

Grădinari
- Commune
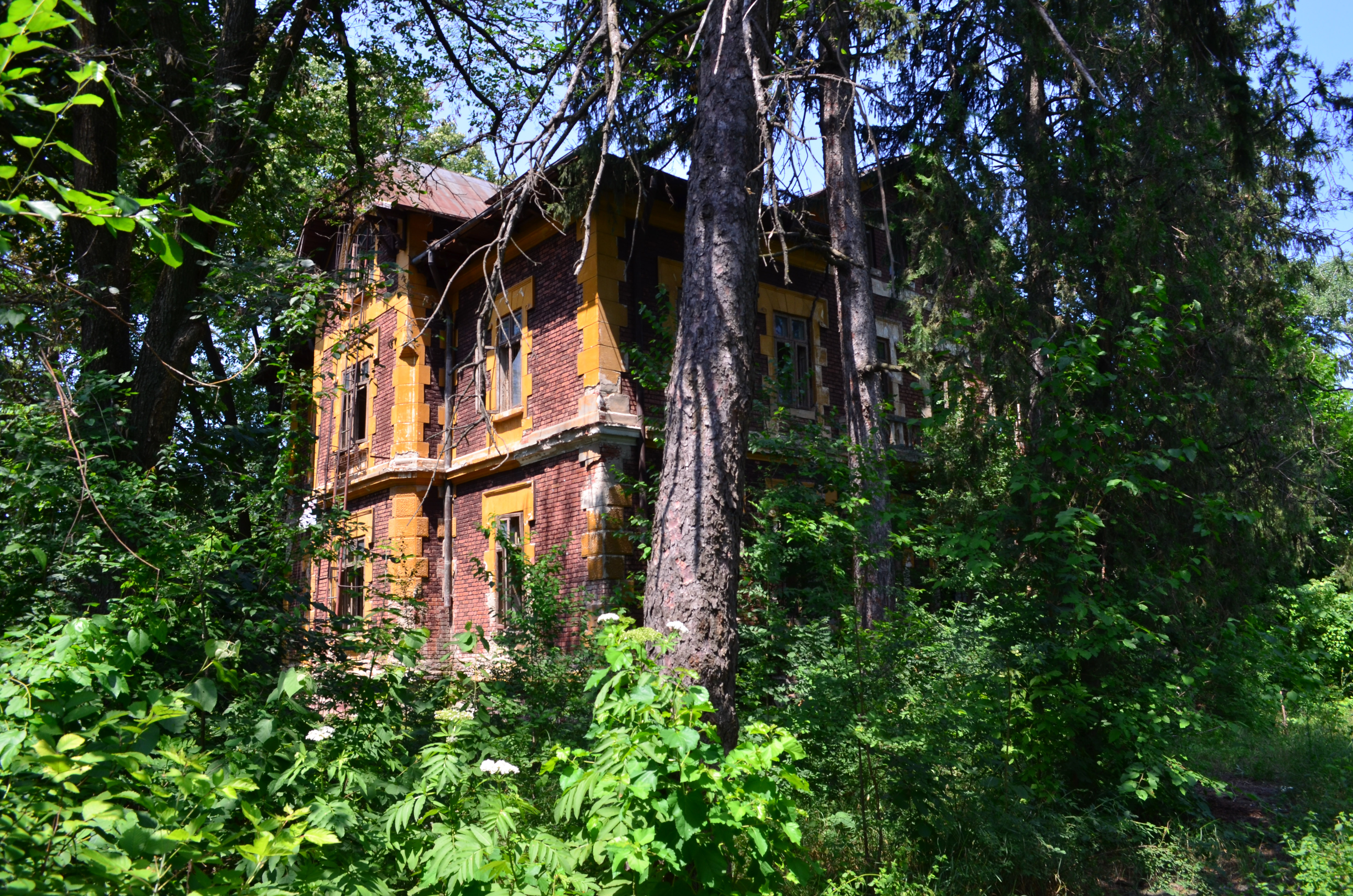
- Oteteleșanu mansion in Grădinari

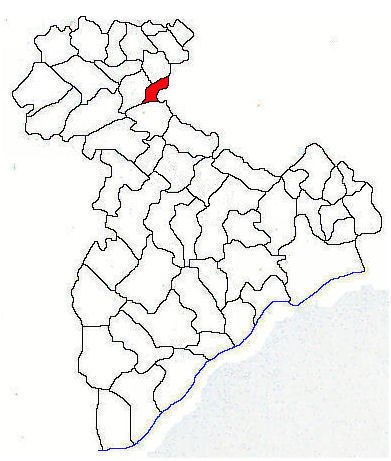
- Location in Giurgiu County

- Location in Romania
- Coordinates: 44°23′N 25°49′E
- Country: Romania
- County: Giurgiu

Government
  - Mayor (2024–2028): Petrică Ștefan (PNL)
- Area: 32.54 km^{2} (12.56 sq mi)
- Elevation: 95 m (312 ft)
- Population (2021-12-01): 3,217
  - Density: 98.86/km^{2} (256.1/sq mi)
- Time zone: UTC+02:00 (EET)
  - Summer (DST): UTC+03:00 (EEST)
- Postal code: 087115
- Area code: +(40) 246
- Vehicle reg.: GR
- Website: primariagradinari-gr.ro

Grădinari is a commune located in Giurgiu County, Muntenia, Romania. It is composed of three villages: Grădinari, Tântava, and Zorile. It was the location of a residence for 250 abandoned children with physical and intellectual disabilities during the 1990s.

Historical population
Year	Pop.	±%
2002	3,801	—
2011	3,578	−5.9%
2021	3,217	−10.1%
Source: Census data
