= Cornel Ciurea =

Moldovan politician

- Born: November 12, 1972 (age 53); Chișinău, Moldova
- Education: National School of Administration and Political Science of Bucharest, Academy of Economic Studies of Moldova
- Employer: Moldova State University

Cornel Ciurea (born November 12, 1972) is an "expert" in politics and governing institutions and a former politician from the Republic of Moldova.

He graduated from the National School of Administration and Political Science of Bucharest and the Academy of Economic Studies of Moldova. Ciurea worked for TeleRadio-Moldova (1994–1996). He served as the director of the weekly Democrația (2006–2009). Ciurea has served as a political expert of the Institute for Development and Social Initiatives (IDIS) “Viitorul” since 2009. Between 2010 and 2011, Ciurea was an Organization for Security and Co-operation in Europe expert on political party legislation and a coordinator of a project on the National Convention for European Integration.

Cornel Ciurea served as a Vice President of the Social Liberal Party (May 9, 2001 – February 10, 2008). He ran for Mayor of Chișinău in the Moldovan local elections of 2007.
