= Isvoarele =

- Commune
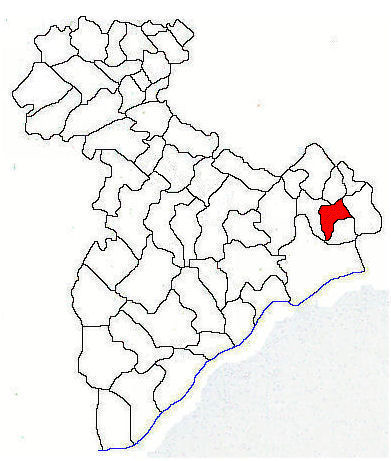
- Location in Giurgiu County

- Location in Romania
- Coordinates: 44.170°N 26.312°E
- Country: Romania
- County: Giurgiu

Government
  - Mayor (2020–2024): Nicușor Logofătu (PSD)
- Area: 24.5 km^{2} (9.5 sq mi)
- Elevation: 41 m (135 ft)
- Population (2021-12-01): 1,491
  - Density: 61/km^{2} (160/sq mi)
- Time zone: EET/EEST (UTC+2/+3)
- Postal code: 87127
- Area code: +(40) 246
- Vehicle reg.: GR
- Website: comunaisvoarele.ro

Isvoarele is a commune located in Giurgiu County, Muntenia, Romania. It is composed of two villages, Isvoarele and Teiușu. These were part of Hotarele Commune until 2004, when they were split off to form a separate commune.

Historical population
Year	Pop.	±%
2002	2,024	—
2011	1,751	−13.5%
2021	1,491	−14.8%
Source: Census data
