= Oinacu =

- Commune
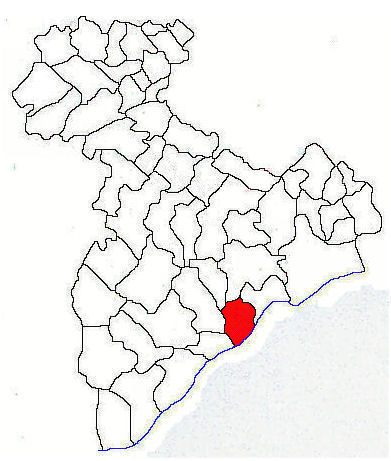
- Location in Giurgiu County

- Location in Romania
- Coordinates: 43°57′N 26°1′E
- Country: Romania
- County: Giurgiu

Government
  - Mayor (2020–2024): Fabian Țîrcă (PNL)
- Area: 41.77 km^{2} (16.13 sq mi)
- Elevation: 19 m (62 ft)
- Population (2021-12-01): 3,937
  - Density: 94/km^{2} (240/sq mi)
- Time zone: EET/EEST (UTC+2/+3)
- Postal code: 87175
- Area code: +(40) 246
- Vehicle reg.: GR
- Website: comunaoinacu.ro

Oinacu is a commune located in Giurgiu County, Muntenia, Romania. This commune is composed of three villages: Braniștea, Comasca, and Oinacu. Comasca was part of Braniștea from 1968 to 2006.

Historical population
Year	Pop.	±%
2002	3,949	—
2011	3,357	−15.0%
2021	3,937	+17.3%
Source: Census data
