= Tudorancea Ciurea =

Romanian general

Tudoranca Ciurea (9 July 1888–24 February 1971) was a Romanian Land Forces brigadier general during World War II.

He advanced in rank to lieutenant colonel in 1932, and to colonel in 1937. In June 1940 he was awarded the Order of the Star of Romania, Officer class. From 1940 to early 1942 Ciurea served as Prefect of Ilfov County; during this time, he oversaw the demolition and rebuilding of Samurcășești Monastery in Ciorogârla, which had been severely affected by the 1940 Vrancea earthquake. In January 1942, he was replaced as prefect by Colonel Cristache Gheorghiu.

In early 1942 Ciurea was promoted to brigadier general, and served as commanding officer Infantry 1st Frontier Division. In 1943 he was named general officer commanding 4th Infantry Division, General Officer Commanding 4th Mountain Division (Vânători de munte), and finally General Officer Commanding Special Reparation Corps. Ciurea retired in November 1944. In May 1945 he was awarded the Order of the Star of Romania, Commander class.
