= Ciorogârla =

- Commune
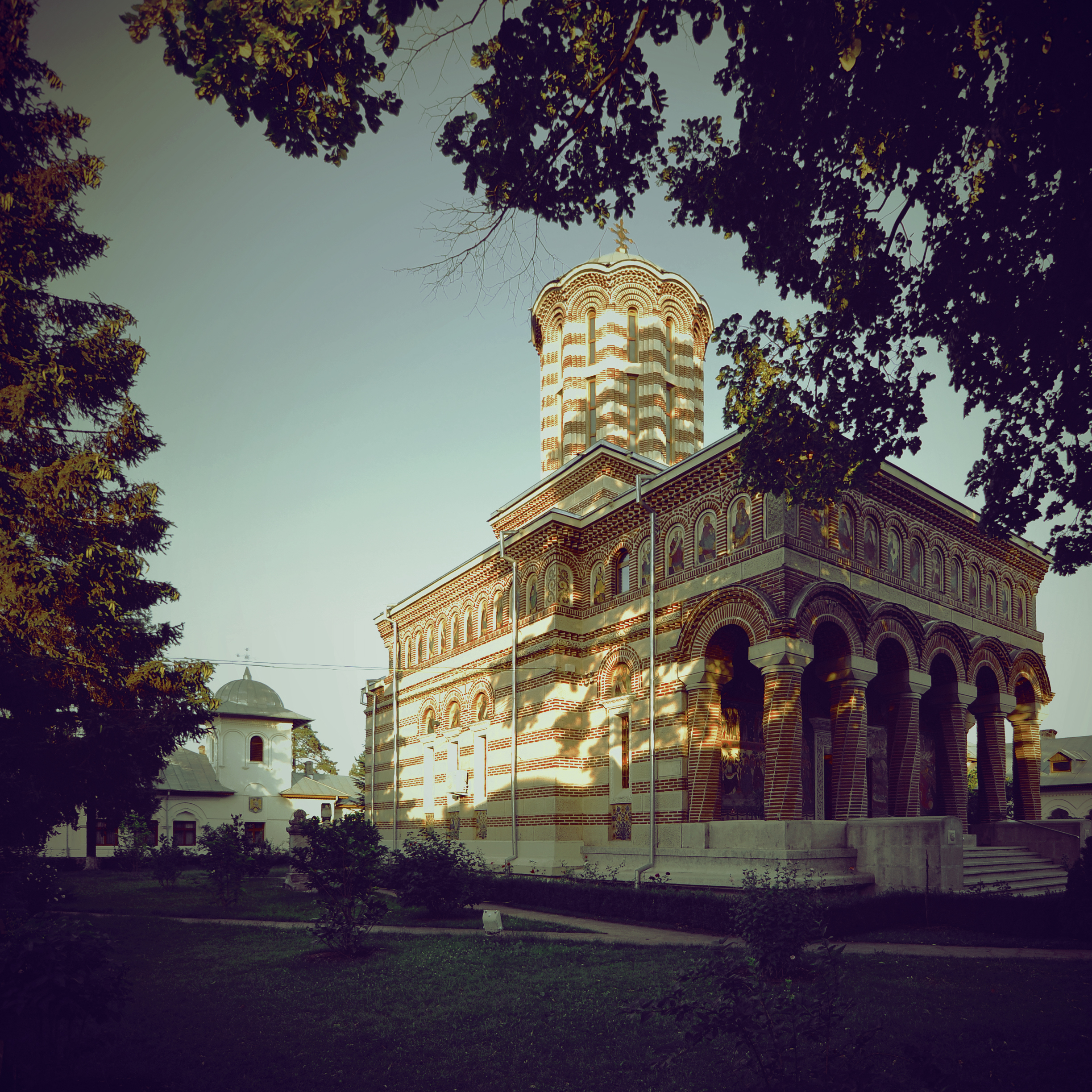
- The Samurcășești Monastery in Ciorogârla

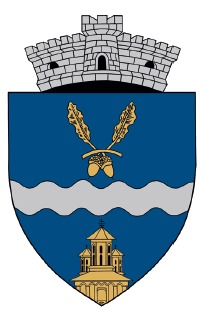
- Coat of arms

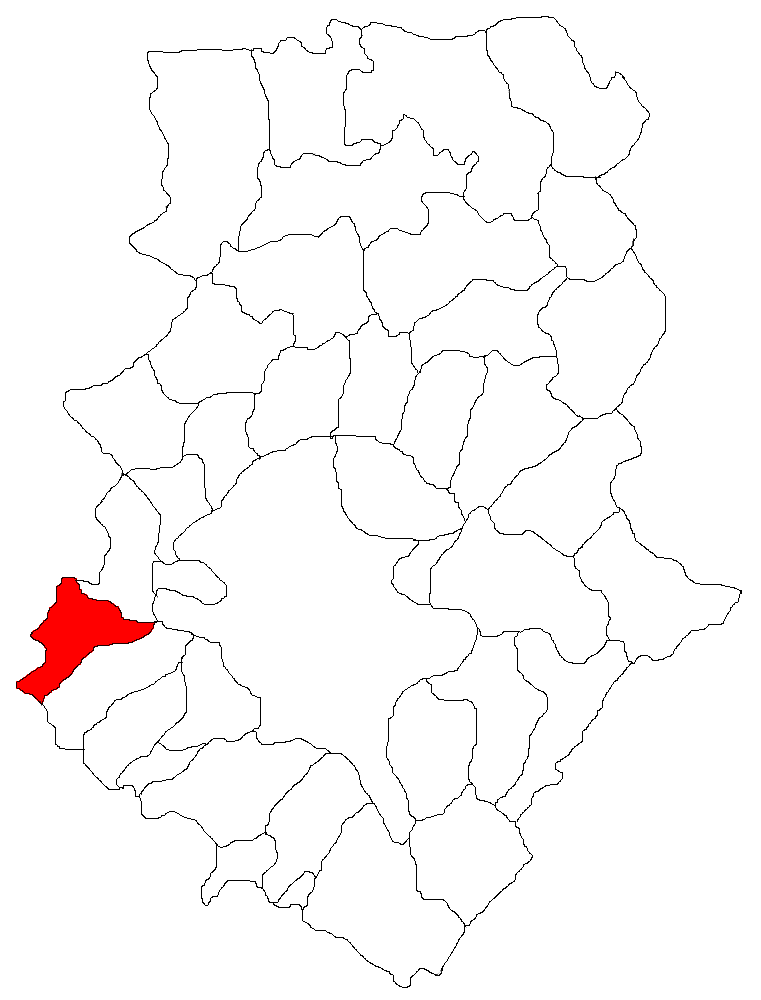
- Location in Ilfov County

- Location in Romania
- Coordinates: 44°27′N 25°53′E
- Country: Romania
- County: Ilfov

Government
  - Mayor (2024–2028): George Nicula (PNL)
- Area: 35 km^{2} (14 sq mi)
- Elevation: 96 m (315 ft)
- Population (2021-12-01): 7,511
  - Density: 210/km^{2} (560/sq mi)
- Time zone: UTC+02:00 (EET)
  - Summer (DST): UTC+03:00 (EEST)
- Postal code: 077055
- Area code: +(40) 21
- Vehicle reg.: IF
- Website: primariaciorogarla.ro

Ciorogârla is a commune in the southwestern part of Ilfov County, Muntenia, Romania. It is composed of two villages, Ciorogârla and Dârvari. The Ciorogârla River flows through this location; its name, of Slavic origin, means "murky stream".

The commune is situated in the Wallachian Plain, on the banks of the Ciorogârla River. It is located in the western part of Ilfov County, about 21 km (13 mi) from Bucharest, on the border with Giurgiu County.

The Samurcășești Monastery, located in Ciorogârla village, was founded in 1808 by vornic Constantin Samurcaș; the church interior was painted by Gheorghe Tattarescu in 1870. Severely affected by the 1940 Vrancea earthquake, the church was demolished and rebuild soon after, under the supervision of the Ilfov County Prefect, Tudorancea Ciurea.

Historical population
Year	Pop.	±%
2002	4,921	—
2011	6,188	+25.7%
2021	7,511	+21.4%
Source: Census data

== Natives ==
- Marin Ion (born 1955), football player and manager
