= Colibași, Giurgiu =

Colibași
- Commune
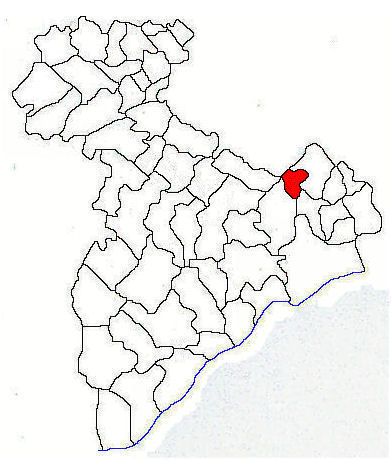
- Location in Giurgiu County

- Location in Romania
- Coordinates: 44°12′N 26°11′E
- Country: Romania
- County: Giurgiu

Government
  - Mayor (2020–2024): Constantin Stoica (PNL)
- Area: 28.2 km^{2} (10.9 sq mi)
- Elevation: 49 m (161 ft)
- Population (2021-12-01): 3,186
  - Density: 110/km^{2} (290/sq mi)
- Time zone: EET/EEST (UTC+2/+3)
- Postal code: 87050
- Area code: +(40) 246
- Vehicle reg.: GR
- Website: primaria-colibasi.ro

Colibași is a commune located in Giurgiu County, Muntenia, Romania. It is composed of two villages, Câmpurelu and Colibași.

The commune is situated in the Wallachian Plain, on the left bank of the Argeș River. It is located in the northeastern side of Giurgiu County, 50 km (31 mi) from the county seat, Giurgiu, on the border with Ilfov County. Its neighbor to the north is Berceni commune; downtown Bucharest is 28 km (17 mi) away.

Historical population
Year	Pop.	±%
2002	3,879	—
2011	3,529	−9.0%
2021	3,186	−9.7%
Source: Census data
