= Iedera =

- Commune
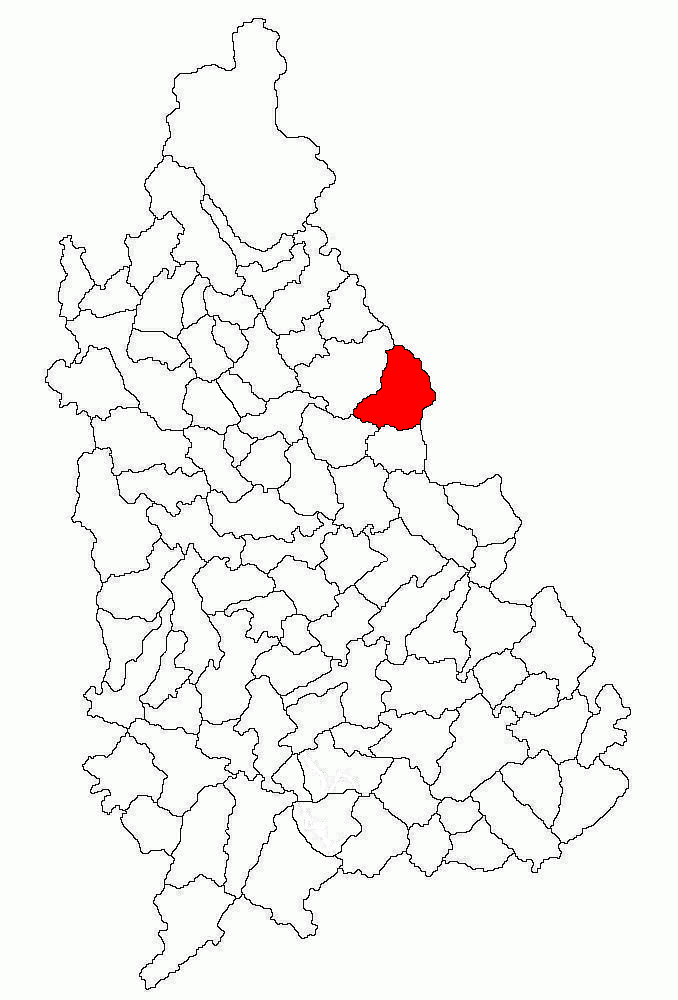
- Location in Dâmbovița County

- Location in Romania
- Coordinates: 45°2′N 25°37′E
- Country: Romania
- County: Dâmbovița

Government
  - Mayor (2024–2028): Cristian Stoica (PNL)
- Area: 53.41 km^{2} (20.62 sq mi)
- Elevation: 317 m (1,040 ft)
- Population (2021-12-01): 3,625
  - Density: 68/km^{2} (180/sq mi)
- Time zone: EET/EEST (UTC+2/+3)
- Postal code: 137263
- Area code: +(40) 245
- Vehicle reg.: DB
- Website: sites.google.com/site/comunaiedera/

Iedera is a commune in Dâmbovița County, Muntenia, Romania with a population of 3,625 people as of 2021. It is composed of four villages: Colibași, Cricovu Dulce, Iedera de Jos (the commune center), and Iedera de Sus.

Historical population
| Year | Pop. | ±% |
|---|---|---|
| 2002 | 3,967 | — |
| 2011 | 4,052 | +2.1% |
| 2021 | 3,625 | −10.5% |
Source: Census data
