= Stănești, Giurgiu =

Stănești
- Commune
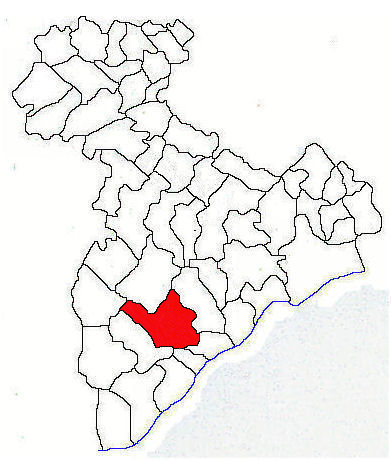
- Location in Giurgiu County

- Location in Romania
- Coordinates: 43.923°N 25.835°E
- Country: Romania
- County: Giurgiu

Government
  - Mayor (2020–2024): Dănuț-Petrișor Mitrea (PSD)
- Area: 95.89 km^{2} (37.02 sq mi)
- Elevation: 63 m (207 ft)
- Population (2021-12-01): 2,548
  - Density: 27/km^{2} (69/sq mi)
- Time zone: EET/EEST (UTC+2/+3)
- Postal code: 087215
- Area code: +(40) 246
- Vehicle reg.: GR
- Website: primaria-stanesti.ro

Stănești is a commune located in Giurgiu County, Muntenia, Romania. It is composed of four villages: Bălanu, Ghizdaru, Oncești, and Stănești.

Historical population
Year	Pop.	±%
2002	3,280	—
2011	3,000	−8.5%
2021	2,548	−15.1%
Source: Census data

== 1907 Peasants' Revolt ==
Stănești is the location where the 1907 Romanian Peasants' Revolt reached its highest intensity. Lieutenant I. Nițulescu was killed here, while Captain Grigore Mareș was wounded after the troops under their command refused their order to fire, and the two officers were attacked by the local peasants.
