= Săbăreni =

- Commune
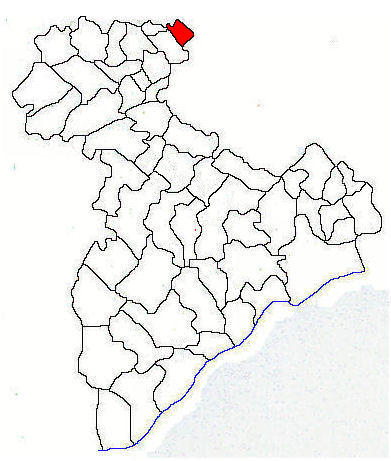
- Location in Giurgiu County

- Location in Romania
- Coordinates: 44°30′N 25°53′E
- Country: Romania
- County: Giurgiu

Government
  - Mayor (2024–2028): Viorel Iosif (PNL)
- Area: 22.93 km^{2} (8.85 sq mi)
- Elevation: 99 m (325 ft)
- Population (2021-12-01): 3,683
  - Density: 160/km^{2} (420/sq mi)
- Time zone: EET/EEST (UTC+2/+3)
- Postal code: 087153
- Area code: +(40) 246
- Vehicle reg.: GR
- Website: comunasabareni.ro

Săbăreni is a commune located in Giurgiu County, Muntenia, Romania. It is composed of a single village, Săbăreni.

Historical population
Year	Pop.	±%
2002	2,631	—
2011	2,864	+8.9%
2021	3,683	+28.6%
Source: Census data
