= Putineiu, Giurgiu =

Putineiu
- Commune
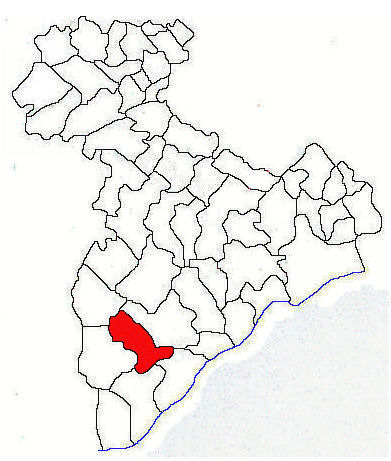
- Location in Giurgiu County

- Location in Romania
- Coordinates: 43°53′N 25°40′E
- Country: Romania
- County: Giurgiu

Government
  - Mayor (2020–2024): Gheorghe Breazu (PNL)
- Area: 77.83 km^{2} (30.05 sq mi)
- Elevation: 74 m (243 ft)
- Population (2021-12-01): 2,128
  - Density: 27/km^{2} (71/sq mi)
- Time zone: EET/EEST (UTC+2/+3)
- Postal code: 087185
- Area code: +(40) 246
- Vehicle reg.: GR
- Website: www.primariaputineiu.ro

Putineiu is a commune located in Giurgiu County, Muntenia, Romania. It is composed of three villages: Hodivoaia, Putineiu, and Vieru.

Historical population
Year	Pop.	±%
2002	2,900	—
2011	2,486	−14.3%
2021	2,128	−14.4%
Source: Census data
