= Zorile, Orhei =

Place in Moldova

Zorile
- Commune
- Interactive map of Zorile
- Country: Moldova
- District: Orhei District

Population (2014)
  - Total: 899
- Time zone: UTC+2 (EET)
  - Summer (DST): UTC+3 (EEST)

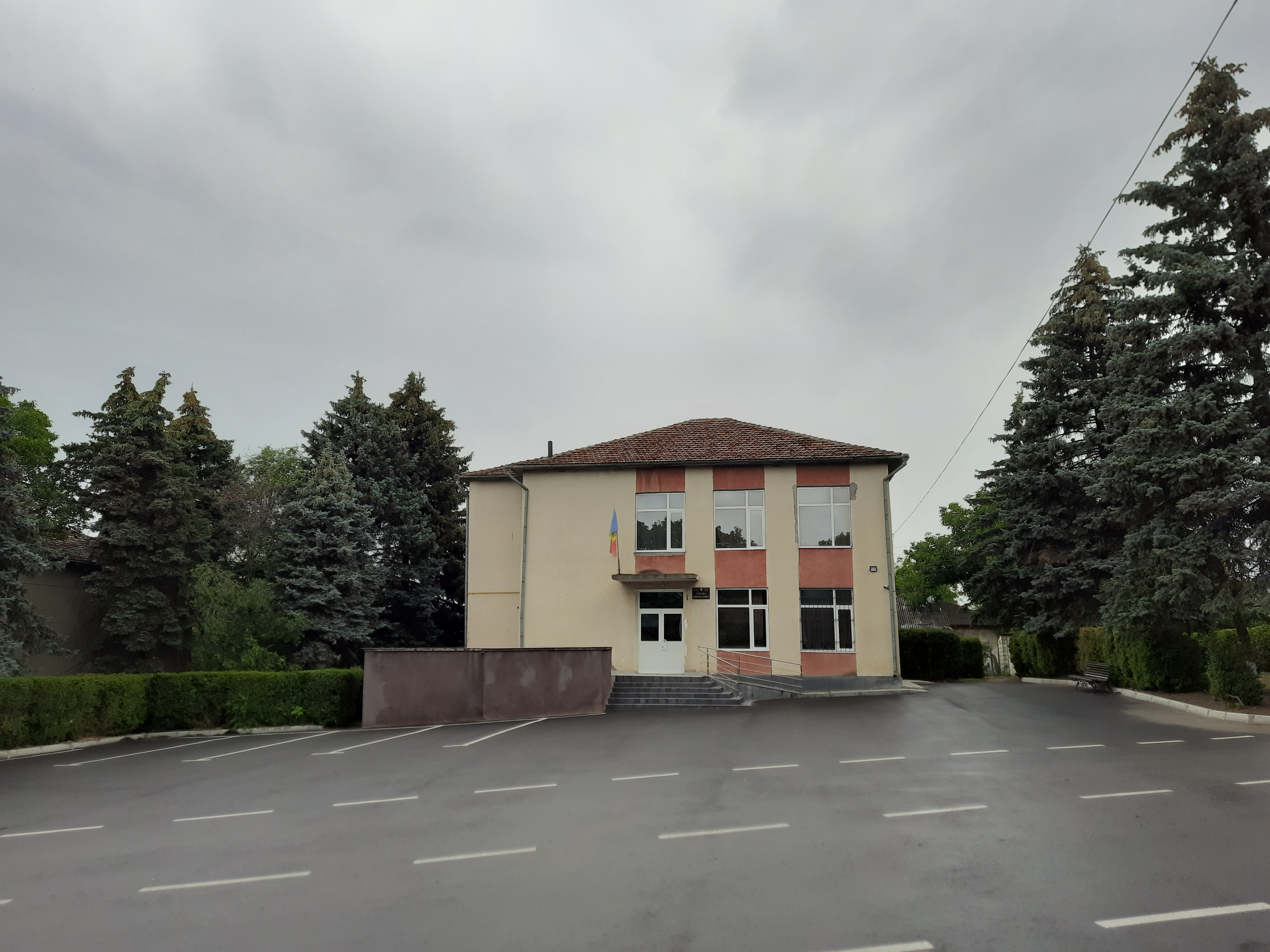
Zorile commune town hall, Orhei district

Zorile is a commune in Orhei District, Moldova. It is composed of three villages: Inculeț, Ocnița-Țărani and Zorile.

As of 2014, Zorile has a population of 899 people.
