= Giurgiu County =

County of Romania

Giurgiu County Județul Giurgiu
- County
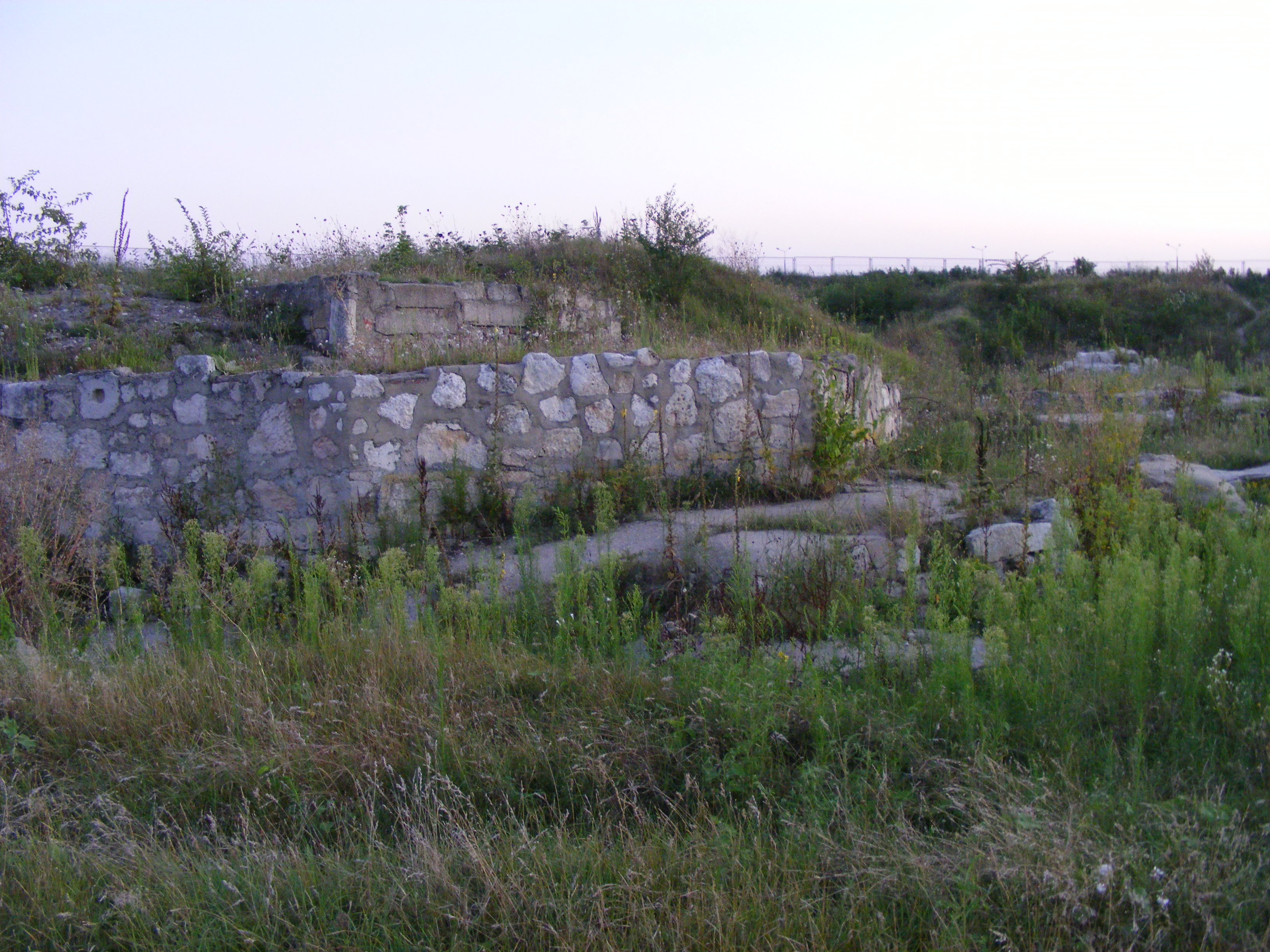
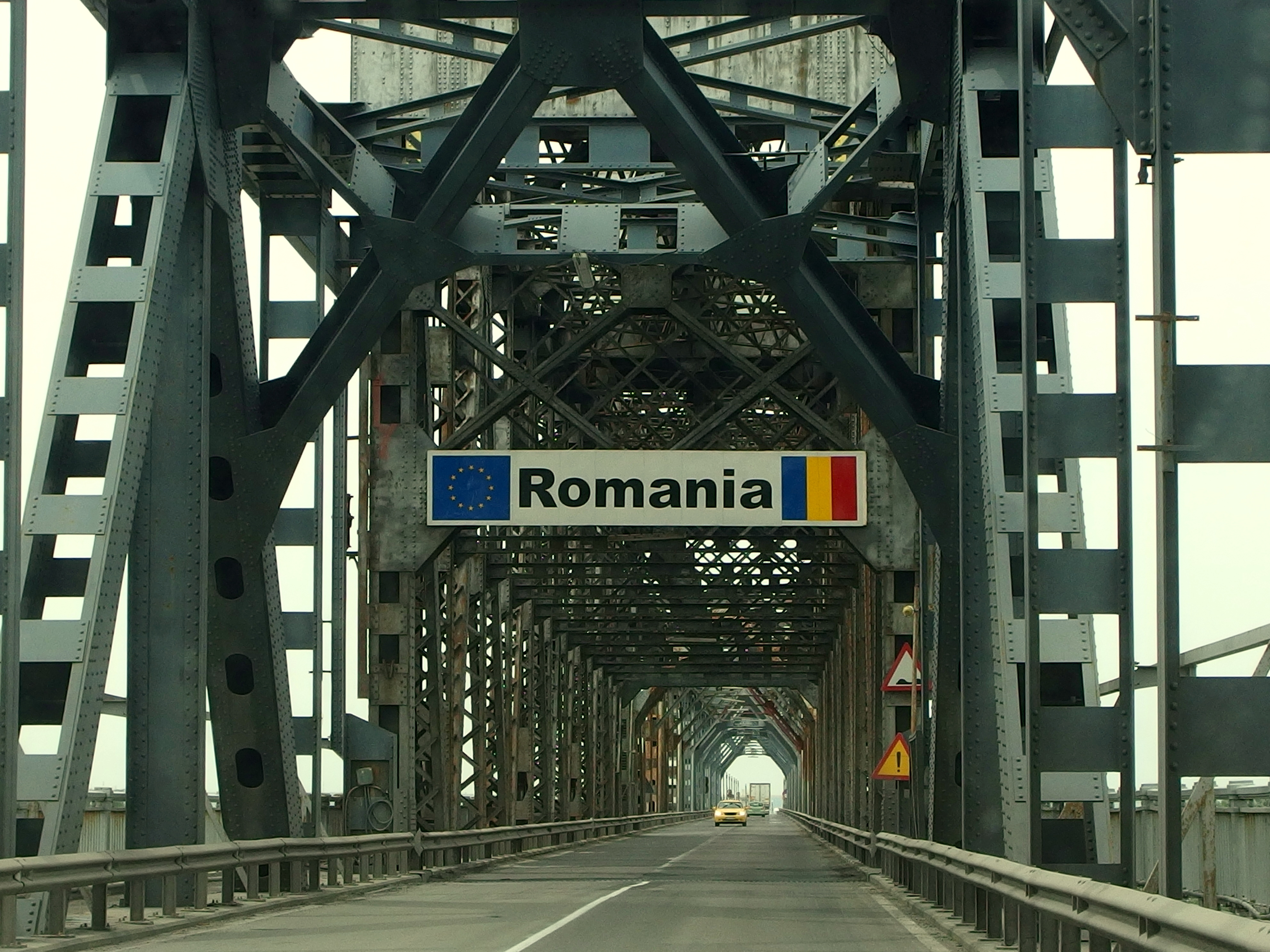
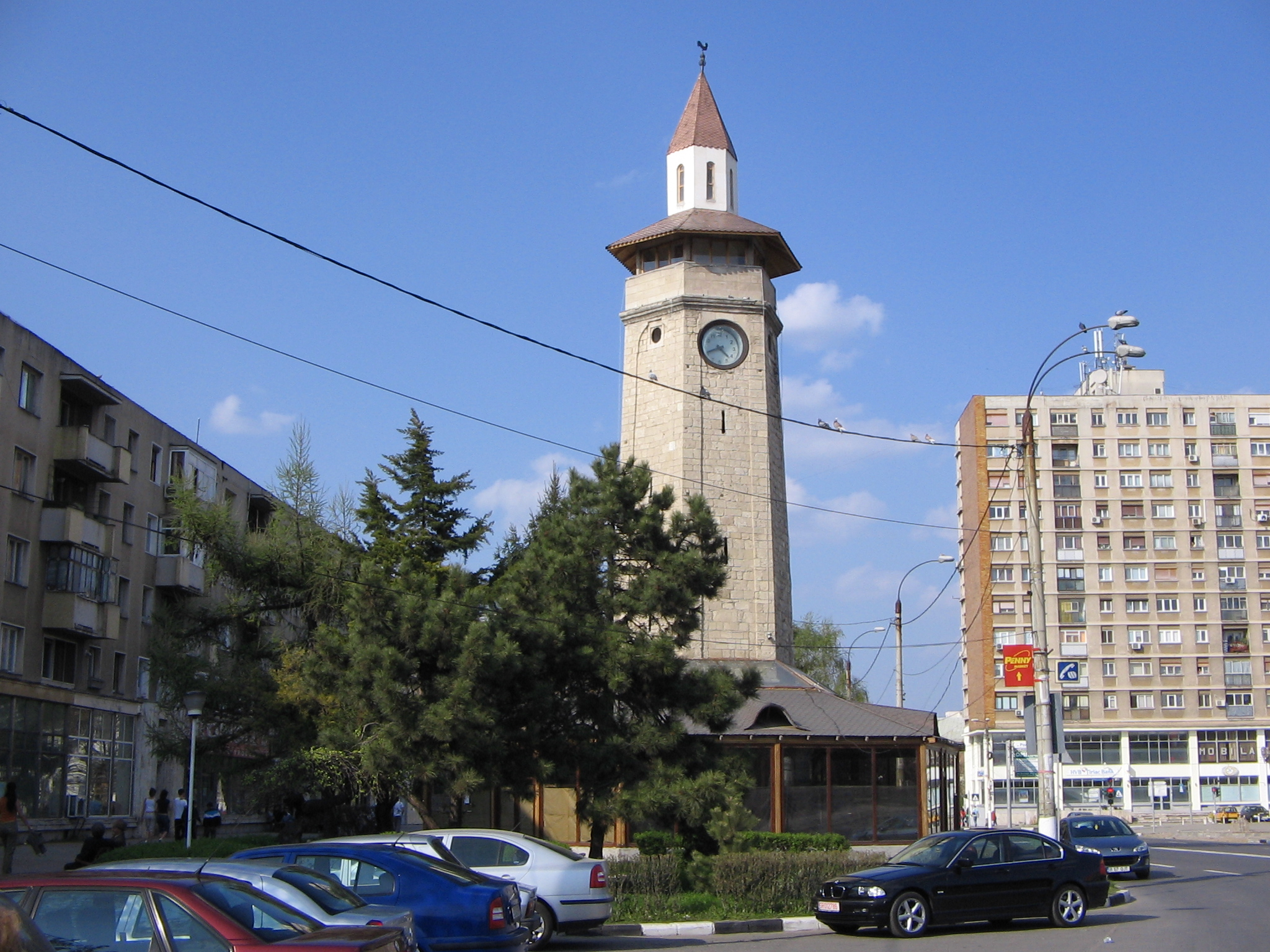
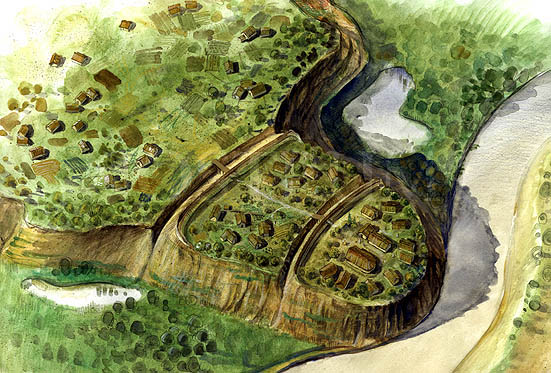
- Fortress of Giurgiu Friendship Bridge Giurgiu Clocktower Illustration of Argedava

- Flag Coat of arms

- Coordinates: 44.16°N 25.9°E
- Country: Romania
- Development region^{1}: Sud
- Historic region: Muntenia
- Capital city (Reședință de județ): Giurgiu
- Created: 1981

Government
  - Type: County Council
  - President of the County Council: Dumitru Beianu (PNL)
  - Prefect^{2}: Florentina Stănculescu

Area
  - Total: 3,526 km^{2} (1,361 sq mi)
  - Rank: 40th in Romania

Population (2021-12-01)
  - Total: 262,066
  - Rank: 38th in Romania
  - Density: 74.32/km^{2} (192.5/sq mi)
- Time zone: UTC+2 (EET)
  - Summer (DST): UTC+3 (EEST)
- Postal Code: 08wxyz^{3}
- Area code: +40 x46^{4}
- Car Plates: GR^{5}
- GDP: US$1.657 billion (2015)
- GDP/capita: US$6,242 (2015)
- Website: County Council; County Prefecture
- ^{1}The developing regions of Romania have no administrative role. They were formed to attract funds from the European Union^{2} as of 2007, the Prefect is not a politician, but a public functionary. He (or she) is not allowed to be a member of a political party, and is banned from any political activity in the first six months after the resignation (or exclusion) from the public functionary corps^{3}w, x, y, and z are digits that indicate the city, the street, part of the street, or even the building of the address^{4}x is a digit indicating the operator: 2 for the former national operator, Romtelecom, and 3 for the other ground telephone networks^{5}used on both the plates of the vehicles that operate only in the county limits (like utility vehicles, ATVs, etc.), and the ones used outside the county

Giurgiu (Romanian pronunciation: [ˈdʒjurdʒju]) is a county (județ) of Romania on the border with Bulgaria, in Muntenia, with the capital city at Giurgiu.

== Demographics ==
In 2011, it had a population of 265,494 and the population density was 75.3/km^{2} (195.0/sq mi).

- Romanians – 96%
- Romani – 3.9%
- Unknown – 0.1%

| Year | County population |
|---|---|
| 1948 | 313,793 |
| 1956 | 325,045 ▲ |
| 1966 | 320,120 ▼ |
| 1977 | 327,494 ▲ |
| 1992 | 313,084 ▼ |
| 2002 | 297,859 ▼ |
| 2011 | 265,494 ▼ |
| 2021 | 262,066 ▼ |

== Geography ==
This county has a total area of 3,526 km^{2} (1,361 sq mi). It is the second-smallest county in Romania, right after the neighboring Ilfov County.

The county is situated on a plain – the Southern part of the Wallachian Plain. The landscape is flat, crossed by small rivers. The southern part is the valley of the Danube which forms the border with Bulgaria. In the North, the Argeș River and Dâmbovița River flow.

=== Neighbours ===
- Călărași County in the East.
- Teleorman County in the West.
- Ilfov County and Dâmbovița County in the North.
- Bulgaria in the South – Ruse Province and Silistra Province.

== Politics ==
The Giurgiu County Council, renewed at the 2020 local elections, consists of 30 counsellors, with the following party composition:

| Party | Seats | Current County Council |
|---|---|---|
| National Liberal Party (PNL) | 18 | |
| Social Democratic Party (PSD) | 12 | |

== Economy ==
While the city of Giurgiu concentrates industrial activities, logistics, and services, Giurgiu County remains predominantly agrarian, with agricultural land dedicated largely to cereal and oilseed cultivation. The county is below national averages for gross domestic product per capita and regional employment levels according to indicators. Proximity to the Bucharest Metropolitan Area has led to the establishment of manufacturing and logistics facilities along the principal transport corridors connecting the county to the capital.

== Administrative divisions ==
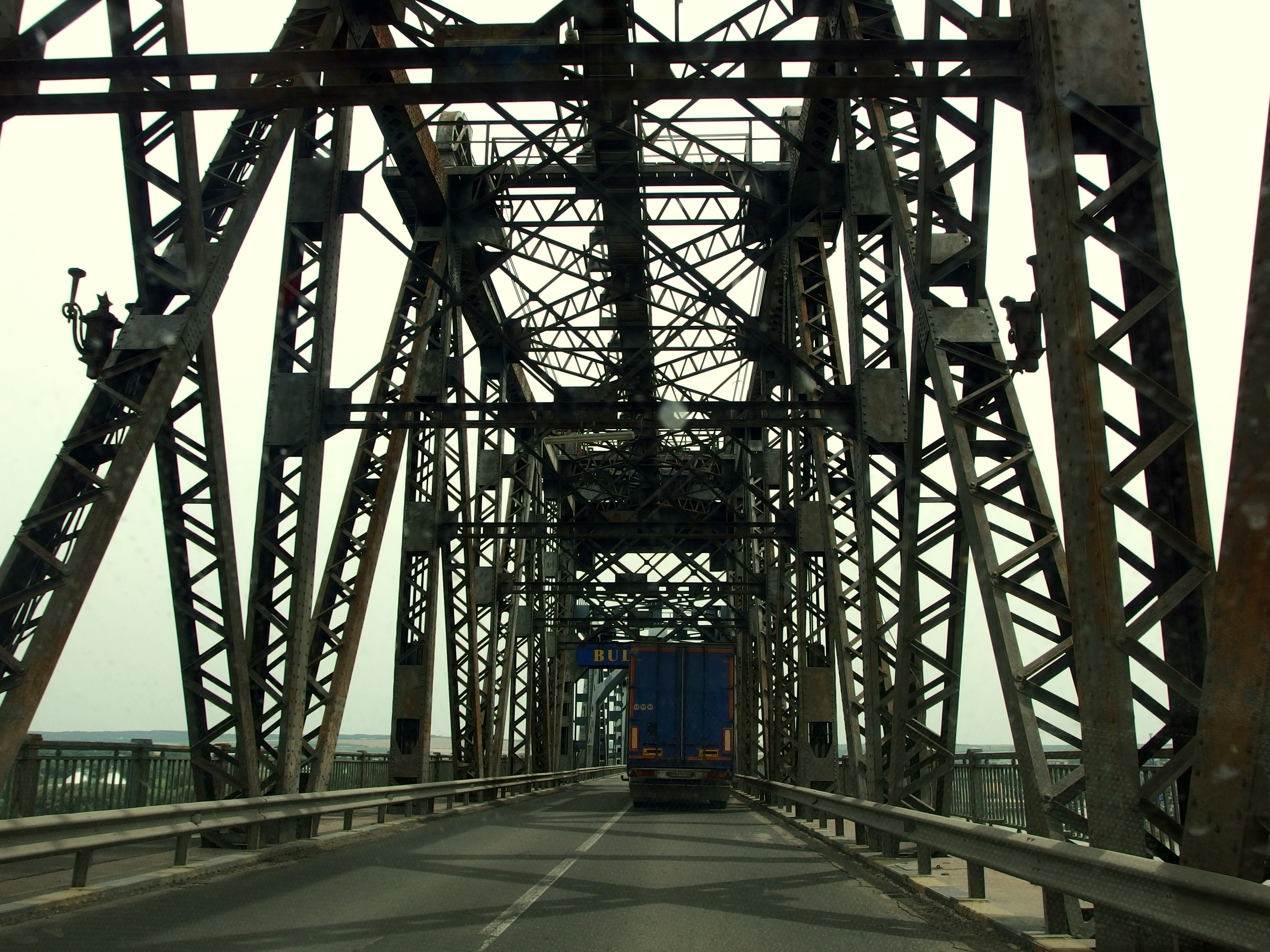
Danube Bridge

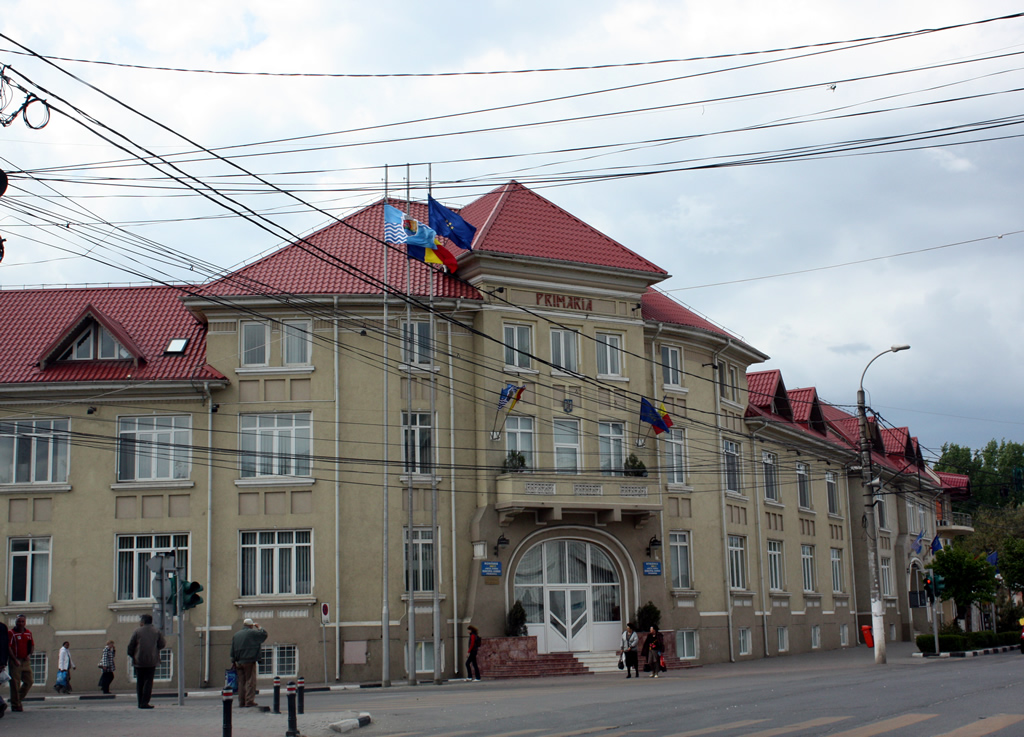
Giurgiu

Giurgiu County has 1 municipality, 2 towns, and 51 communes:

- Municipalities
  - Giurgiu – capital city; population: 54,655 (as of 2011)
- Towns
  - Bolintin-Vale
  - Mihăilești
- Communes
  - Adunații-Copăceni
  - Băneasa
  - Bolintin-Deal
  - Bucșani
  - Bulbucata
  - Buturugeni
  - Călugăreni
  - Clejani
  - Colibași
  - Comana
  - Cosoba
  - Crevedia Mare
  - Daia
  - Florești-Stoenești
  - Frătești
  - Găiseni
  - Găujani
  - Ghimpați
  - Gogoșari
  - Gostinari
  - Gostinu
  - Grădinari
  - Greaca
  - Herăşti
  - Hotarele
  - Iepurești
  - Isvoarele
  - Izvoarele
  - Joița
  - Letca Nouă
  - Malu
  - Mârșa
  - Mihai Bravu
  - Ogrezeni
  - Oinacu
  - Prundu
  - Putineiu
  - Răsuceni
  - Roata de Jos
  - Săbăreni
  - Schitu
  - Singureni
  - Slobozia
  - Stănești
  - Stoenești
  - Toporu
  - Ulmi
  - Valea Dragului
  - Vânătorii Mici
  - Vărăști
  - Vedea
