= Glavacioc =

- Location within Romania

Location
- Country: Romania
- Counties: Argeș, Dâmbovița, Teleorman, Giurgiu
- Towns: Videle

Physical characteristics
- Source: Ștefan cel Mare, Argeș County, Romania
  - coordinates: 44°31′34″N 25°06′19″E
  - elevation: 181 m (594 ft)
- Mouth: Câlniștea
  - location: Ghimpați
  - coordinates: 44°09′37″N 25°48′07″E
  - elevation: 56 m (184 ft)
- Length: 120 km (75 mi)
- Basin size: 682 km^{2} (263 sq mi)

Basin features
- Progression: Câlniștea→ Neajlov→ Argeș→ Danube→ Black Sea

The Glavacioc is a left tributary of the river Câlniștea in Romania. It discharges into the Câlniștea near Cămineasca. Its length is 120 km (75 mi) and its basin size is 682 km^{2} (263 sq mi). It flows through the villages Ștefan cel Mare, Glavacioc, Brătești, Cătunu, Poeni, Butești, Puranii de Sus, Purani, Baciu, Blejești, Videle, Rădulești, Crevenicu, Merenii de Sus, Merenii de Jos, Ștefeni, Letca Veche and Ghimpați.

== Tributaries ==
The following rivers are tributaries to the river Glavacioc:

- Left: Glavaciocul Mare, Fătăceni, Valea de Margine, Milcovăț
- Right: Vii, Căldăraru, Sericu
