= Sericu =

- Location within Romania

Location
- Country: Romania
- Counties: Teleorman County
- Towns: Videle

Physical characteristics
- Source
  - coordinates: 44°22′57″N 25°17′12″E
  - elevation: 136 m (446 ft)
- Mouth: Glavacioc
  - location: Videle
  - coordinates: 44°16′07″N 25°31′22″E
  - elevation: 101 m (331 ft)
- Length: 30 km (19 mi)
- Basin size: 103 km^{2} (40 sq mi)

Basin features
- Progression: Glavacioc→ Câlniștea→ Neajlov→ Argeș→ Danube→ Black Sea

The Sericu is a right tributary of the river Glavacioc in Romania. It discharges into the Glavacioc in Videle. It flows through the towns and villages Siliștea Mică, Ciuperceni, Cosmești, Sericu and Videle. Its length is 30 km (19 mi) and its basin size is 103 km^{2} (40 sq mi).
