= Vlașca County =

Județul Vlașca
- County (Județ)
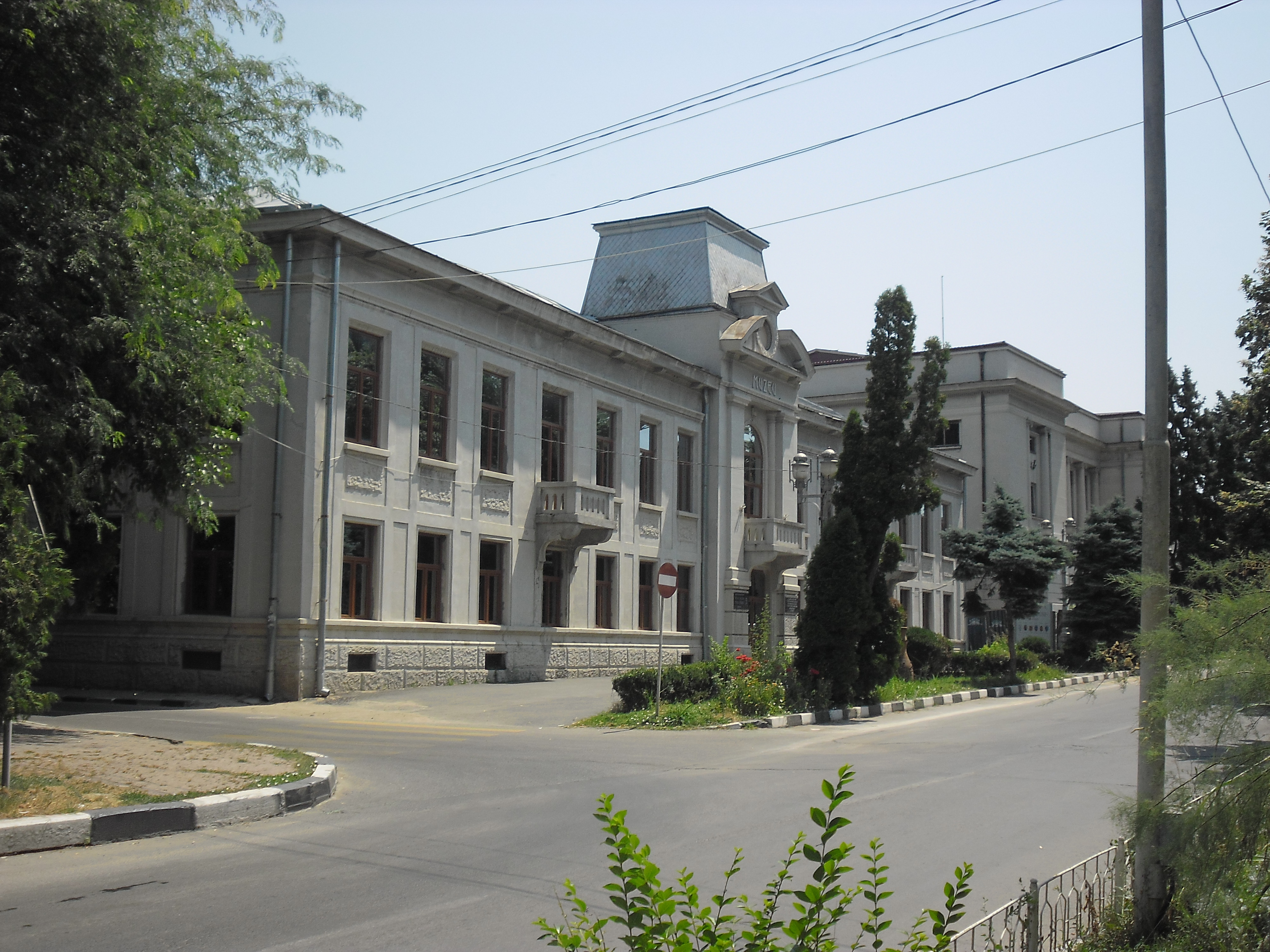
- The Vlaşca County Prefecture's building from the interwar period, now a museum.

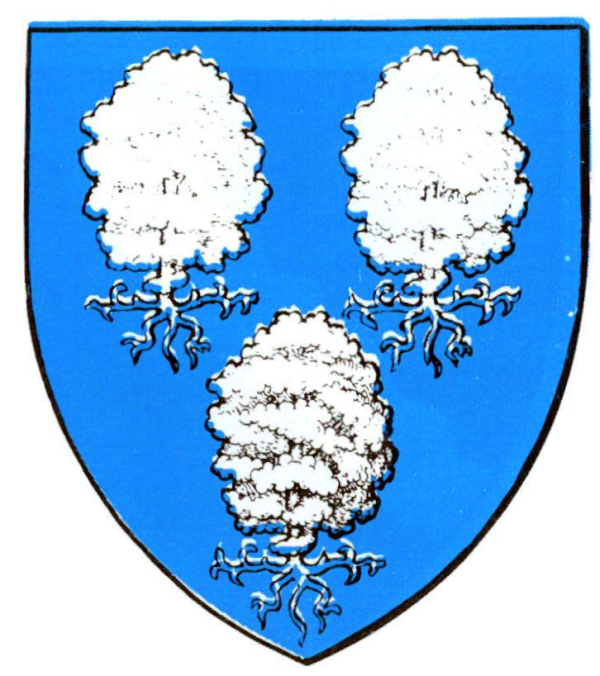
- Coat of arms

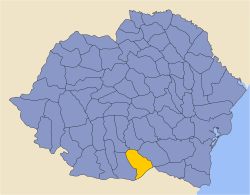
- Country: Romania
- Historic region: Wallachia
- County seat (Reședință de județ): Giurgiu
- Established: Sometime before 1601
- Ceased to exist: Administrative reform of 1950

Area
  - Total: 4,494 km^{2} (1,735 sq mi)

Population (1930)
  - Total: 296,412
  - Density: 65.96/km^{2} (170.8/sq mi)
- Time zone: UTC+2 (EET)
  - Summer (DST): UTC+3 (EEST)

Vlașca County is a former first-order administrative division of the Kingdom of Romania, in southern Muntenia, located between Bucharest and the Danube, which is now mostly the county of Giurgiu. The county seat was Giurgiu.

The county was located in the southern part of Greater Romania, in the southern part of the historical region of Muntenia. The county was bordered on the west by Teleorman County, on the northwest by Argeș County, on the north by Dâmbovița County, on the east by Ilfov County, and to the south by the Kingdom of Bulgaria. Its surface coincides in large part with that of the present Giurgiu County, but there are small parts of it that are included in today's Teleorman County.

== Administrative organization ==
The counties of Wallachia after 1601, including Vlașca

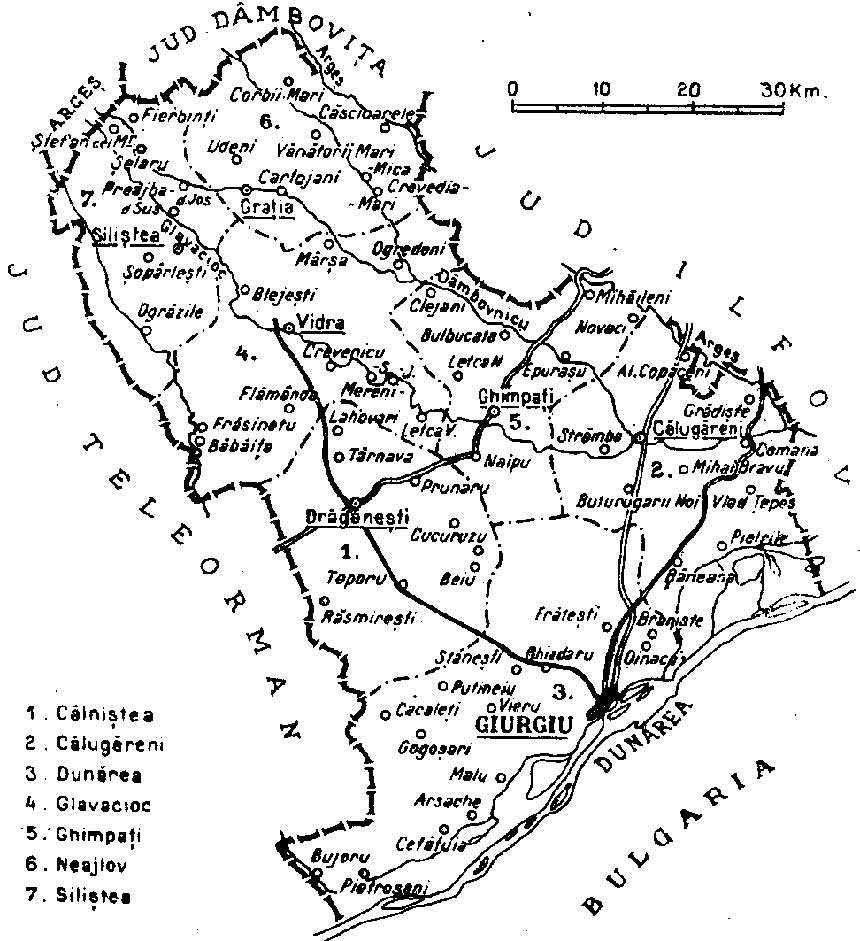
Map of Vlașca County as constituted in 1938.

Administratively, until the 1930s, Vlașca County was divided into five districts (plăși):

1. Plasa Călugăreni, headquartered at Călugăreni
2. Plasa Câlniștea, headquartered at Drăgănești-Vlașca
3. Plasa Dunărea, headquartered at Giurgiu
4. Plasa Glavacioc, headquartered at Glavacioc
5. Plasa Neajlov, headquartered initially at Neajlovu, and later at Corbii Mari.

In 1938, the county was divided into seven districts:

1. Plasa Călugăreni, headquartered at Călugăreni
2. Plasa Câlniștea, headquartered at Drăgănești-Vlașca
3. Plasa Dunărea, headquartered at Giurgiu
4. Plasa Ghimpați, headquartered at Ghimpați
5. Plasa Glavacioc, headquartered at Glavacioc
6. Plasa Neajlov, headquartered initially at Neajlovu, and later at Corbii Mari.
7. Plasa Siliștea, headquartered at Siliștea Gumești

== After 1938 ==
In 1938, the county was disestablished and incorporated into the newly formed Ținutul Argeș, but it was re-established in 1940 after the fall of Carol II's regime - only to be abolished 10 years later by the Communist regime.

=== Population ===
According to the 1930 census data, the county population was 296,412 inhabitants, ethnically divided as follows: 97.1% Romanians, 2.2% Romanies, 0.2% Hungarians, as well as other minorities. From the religious point of view, the population was 99.4% Eastern Orthodox, 0.2% Roman Catholic, 0.1% Adventist, as well as other minorities.

==== Urban population ====
In 1930, the county's urban population was 31,016 inhabitants, comprising 92.7% Romanians, 2.4% Romanies, 1.0% Hungarians, 0.7% Jews, as well as other minorities. From the religious point of view, the urban population was composed of 96.4% Eastern Orthodox, 1.3% Roman Catholic, 0.8% Jewish, as well as other minorities.
