= Bratilov =

- Location within Romania

Location
- Country: Romania
- Counties: Giurgiu County

Physical characteristics
- Mouth: Milcovăț
  - location: Milcovățu
  - coordinates: 44°15′35″N 25°42′09″E
  - elevation: 77 m (253 ft)
- Length: 29 km (18 mi)
- Basin size: 69 km^{2} (27 sq mi)

Basin features
- Progression: Milcovăț→ Glavacioc→ Câlniștea→ Neajlov→ Argeș→ Danube→ Black Sea

The Bratilov is a left tributary of the river Milcovăț in Romania. It flows into the Milcovăț in the village Milcovățu. Its length is 29 km (18 mi) and its basin size is 69 km^{2} (27 sq mi).
