= Milcovăț =

- Location within Romania

Location
- Country: Romania
- Counties: Teleorman, Giurgiu
- Villages: Coșoaia, Milcovățu, Letca Nouă

Physical characteristics
- Source
  - coordinates: 44°20′17″N 25°29′37″E
  - elevation: 111 m (364 ft)
- Mouth: Glavacioc
  - location: Ghimpați
  - coordinates: 44°11′13″N 25°46′32″E
  - elevation: 61 m (200 ft)
- Length: 45 km (28 mi)
- Basin size: 215 km^{2} (83 sq mi)

Basin features
- Progression: Glavacioc→ Câlniștea→ Neajlov→ Argeș→ Danube→ Black Sea
- Tributaries
  - left: Bratilov

The Milcovăț is a left tributary of the river Glavacioc in Romania. It discharges into the Glavacioc in Ghimpați. Its length is 45 km (28 mi) and its basin size is 215 km^{2} (83 sq mi).
