= Vii (river) =

- Location within Romania

Location
- Country: Romania
- Counties: Teleorman County
- Villages: Siliștea, Puranii de Sus

Physical characteristics
- Source
  - coordinates: 44°24′48″N 25°16′19″E
  - elevation: 142 m (466 ft)
- Mouth: Glavacioc
  - location: Puranii de Sus
  - coordinates: 44°22′25″N 25°22′50″E
  - elevation: 124 m (407 ft)
- Length: 17 km (11 mi)
- Basin size: 44 km^{2} (17 sq mi)

Basin features
- Progression: Glavacioc→ Câlniștea→ Neajlov→ Argeș→ Danube→ Black Sea

The Vii is a right tributary of the river Glavacioc in Romania. It discharges into the Glavacioc in Puranii de Sus. Its length is 17 km (11 mi) and its basin size is 44 km^{2} (17 sq mi).
