= Moculescu =

Moculescu is a Romanian surname. Notable people with the surname include:

- Horia Moculescu (1937–2025), Romanian pianist, composer, and producer
- Stelian Moculescu (born 1950), Romanian volleyball coach and player

== See also ==
- Miculescu
