= Ion Caramitru =

Romanian actor (1942–2021)

Ion Caramitru OBE
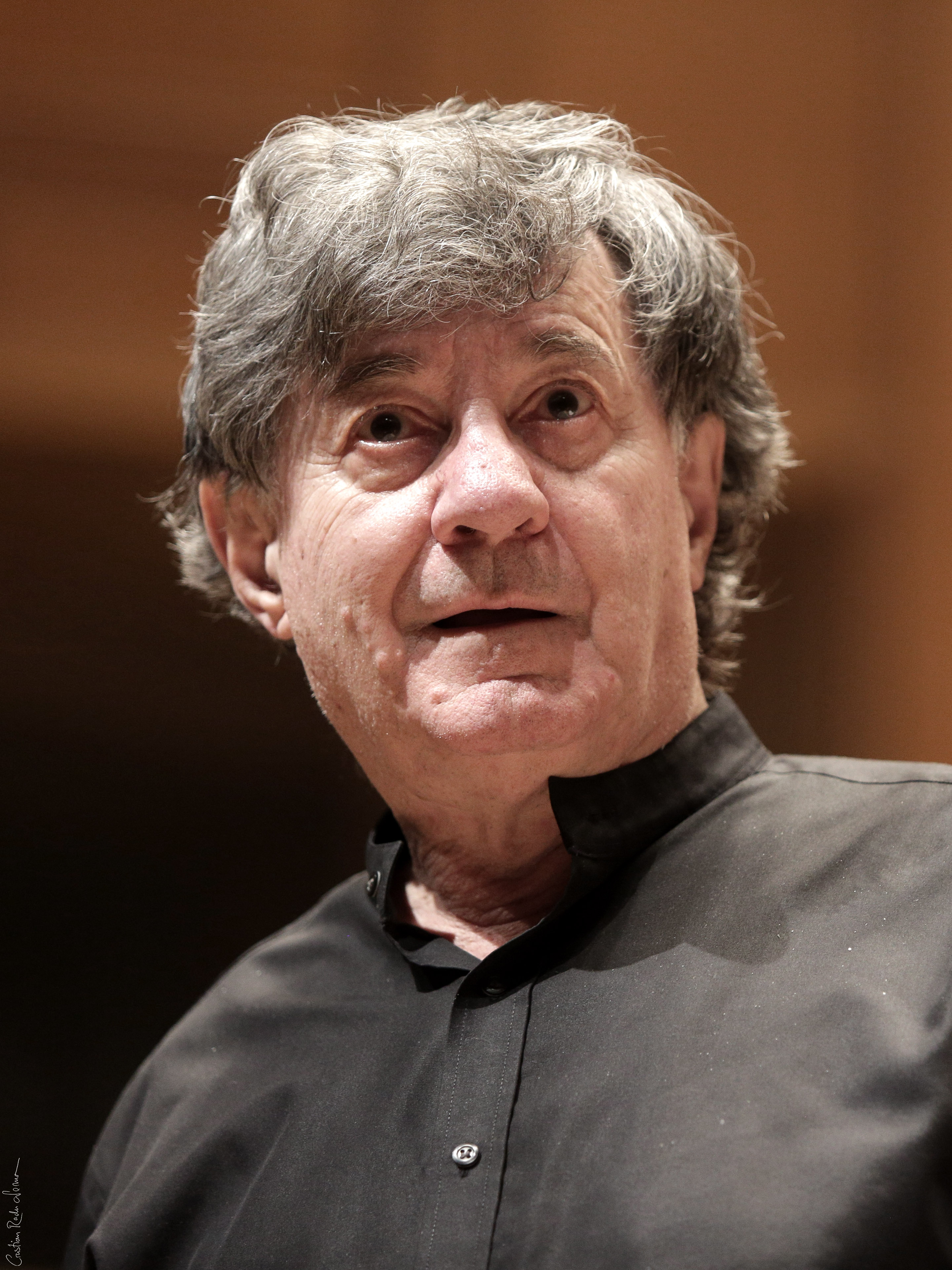
- Caramitru in January 2017
- Born: Ion Horia Leonida Caramitru; 9 March 1942; Bucharest, Romania
- Died: 5 September 2021 (aged 79); Bucharest, Romania
- Resting place: Bellu Cemetery
- Occupations: Actor, theatre director, politician
- Office: Minister of Culture of Romania; Director of the National Theatre Bucharest
- Spouse: Micaela Caracaș
- Children: 3

Ion Horia Leonida Caramitru (Romanian pronunciation: [iˈon karaˈmitru]; 9 March 1942 – 5 September 2021) was a Romanian stage and film actor, stage director, and political figure. He was Minister of Culture between 1996 and 2000, in the Romanian Democratic Convention (CDR) cabinets of Victor Ciorbea, Gavril Dejeu, Radu Vasile, Alexandru Athanasiu, and Mugur Isărescu. He was married to actress Micaela Caracaș and had three sons: Ștefan, Andrei, and Matei Caramitru. He was a relevant figure of the Aromanian community of Romania.

== Early life and acting career ==
Ion Caramitru was born in an Aromanian family, with his mother being from Ano Grammatiko (Aromanian: Grãmãticuva) in modern Greece while his father being from Korçë (Aromanian: Curceaua, Curceauã, Curceau or Curciau) in modern Albania. Nevertheless, Caramitru had a Megleno-Romanian grandfather. Caramitru was born in Bucharest, and graduated from the I. L. Caragiale Institute for Theater and Film Arts in 1964, having debuted on the stage a year earlier — with the title role in an acclaimed production of William Shakespeare's Hamlet for the Bulandra Theater. He continued his engagement in Bulandra while starring in plays at the National Theatre Bucharest and various other theaters.

Caramitru was a protagonist in a series of theatrical productions by directors such as Liviu Ciulei, Moni Ghelerter, Andrei Șerban, Silviu Purcărete, Sanda Manu, Cătălina Buzoianu, Alexandru Tocilescu, and Sică Alexandrescu (acting in plays such as Mihail Sebastian's Steaua fără nume, Georg Büchner's Danton's Death, Aeschylus' The Oresteia, Tennessee Williams's A Streetcar Named Desire, Carlo Goldoni's Il bugiardo, and in many of Shakespeare's works). As a director of theater, opera, and operetta productions, Caramitru notably staged works by Frederick Loewe (My Fair Lady), Marin Sorescu (The Third Stake), Benjamin Britten (The Little Sweep), Aleksei Nikolaevich Arbuzov (The Lie), and Shakespeare (The Merchant of Venice); his adaptations of Peter Brook's La Tragédie de Carmen and Pyotr Ilyich Tchaikovsky's Eugene Onegin were hosted by the Grand Opera House in Belfast, Northern Ireland.

Caramitru starred in over 30 feature films, making his debut with a supporting role in Victor Iliu's Comoara din Vadul Vechi (1965). Among his best-known roles are Vive in Diminețile unui băiat cuminte (1966), Gheorghidiu in Între oglinzi paralele (1978), Ștefan Luchian in Luchian (1981), and Socrate in the Liceenii series (1985–1987). Later in life, Caramitru has had minor roles in foreign films: he was an anarchist in the 1991 Kafka, Tatevsky in Citizen X (1995), Zozimov in Mission: Impossible (1996), Count Fontana in Amen. (2002), and a European immigrant to Ireland in Adam & Paul (2004).

In May 2005, he won the competition to be general director of the National Theatre Bucharest, replacing Dinu Săraru.

== Political career ==
=== Revolution ===
Caramitru entered political life as an opponent of the communist regime in the Romanian Revolution of 1989. On 22 December 1989, after President Nicolae Ceaușescu had fled Bucharest, Caramitru and the known dissident writer Mircea Dinescu joined the crowd occupying the Romanian Television building, and were prominent among the numerous speakers who were proclaiming revolutionary victory.

A popular rumor circulating soon after the episode alleged that, unaware of being filmed, Caramitru had addressed Dinescu, saying, "Mircea, fă-te că lucrezi!" ("Mircea, pretend you are working!"); this version of events may have started as defamation by political adversaries, with the purpose of indicating that the Revolution was a carefully staged front for a coup d'état. According to Alex Mihai Stoenescu's research, despite its passing into contemporary folklore, such a phrase was never uttered; instead, the words used were "Mircea, arăți că lucrezi" ("Mircea, show that you are working on something" — while holding Dinescu's booklet in front of camera), to which Dinescu replied "La un apel" ("[I'm working] on an appeal [to the people]") — pointing rather to their ill-preparedness and their preoccupation in quickly drafting a proper document.

=== FSN and CDR ===
He was an early member of the National Salvation Front (FSN) Council, the government formed around Ion Iliescu, where he was in charge of Culture. In February 1990, after the FSN had become a political party, he withdrew from the body in protest, arguing that the Iliescu grouping was attempting to use executive power and prestige in order to monopolize power (the gesture was preceded by the resignation of other intellectuals present in the FSN Council, including Doina Cornea and Ana Blandiana). Already a member of the Civic Alliance Foundation, he joined the National Peasants' Party, which engaged in opposition to the FSN, and became Minister of Culture after the CDR coalition won the elections of 1996.

Following the defeat in the 2000 elections and the party's breakup, he remained a member of the main PNȚ wing, the Christian-Democratic People's Party (PPCD). Caramitru opposed the PPCD leader Gheorghe Ciuhandu on several grounds, including the merger with the Union for Romanian Reconstruction; he advocated a reconciliation with former president Constantinescu, and was among the PPCD members to declare themselves alarmed by the possibility of Ioan Talpeș joining the party (Talpeș, who had left the PSD, had served as head of the Romanian Foreign Intelligence Service in 1992–1997). In February 2006, he handed in his resignation as vice-president of the PPCD.

=== Other causes ===
In the early 1990s, arguing that the granting of revolutionary diplomas and privileges had become an instrument of corruption, Caramitru, together with other revolutionaries and dissidents (Victor Rebengiuc, Dan Pavel, Radu Filipescu, and Costică Canacheu), formed the non-governmental organization Asociația Revoluționarilor fără Privilegii (the Association of Non-Privileged Revolutionaries).

A noted figure within the Aromanian community, Caramitru was a member of the Macedo-Romanian Cultural Society, which involved itself in debates with Comunitatea Aromână din România (CAR): Caramitru and his supporters argued that Aromanians are a branch of the Romanians, whereas CAR campaigns for their recognition as an ethnic minority (with automatic representation in the Parliament of Romania).

In 2006, during a visit in Moldova, Caramitru claimed that Moldova is still a part of Romania, leading to a diplomatic row between Romania and Moldova and Caramitru being declared a persona non grata in Moldova.

== Awards and recognition ==
For his work in establishing British-Romanian cultural links, Caramitru was named an Officer of the Order of the British Empire. In 1997, the French Ministry of Culture awarded him the title of Chevalier des Arts et des Lettres.

=== Honours ===
- (Romania) Honorary Doctor of the George Enescu University of Arts, Iași, 2008
- (Moldova) Honorary Doctor of the Academy for Music, Theatre and Visual Arts of Chișinău, 2018
- (North Macedonia) Honorary Doctor of the ESRA Audiovisual Arts University of Skopje, 2016

=== National and Royal decorations ===
- (Romania) Romanian Royal Family: Knight of the Royal Decoration of the Cross of the Romanian Royal House
- Order of Merit, Grand Cross, Romania, 2000
- Order of the Star of Romania, Knight, 2017
- (United Kingdom) Honorary Officer of the Order of the British Empire (OBE), 1995
- Knight of the Order of Arts and Letters, France, 1997
- (Japan) Order of the Rising Sun, Gold Rays with Ribbon, 2017

== Death ==
Caramitru died on 5 September 2021, aged 79, in the Elias Hospital, Bucharest. Following the news, the Royal House of Romania issued a statement with condolences, calling him "a devoted and courageous defender of the principles and values of the Crown".

== Filmography ==
Most of his career as a film actor Ion Caramitru was connected with the communist filmography, especially directed by Sergiu Nicolaescu, a film directilor who was an accomplice of the same Aromanian origins as I. Caramitru. Even in the major role of his life, the ciné-verité realised during the 1989 Romanian Revolution, Caramitru was cast by Sergiu Nicolaescu. His repeated replicas from the balcony of the communistbl Central Committee's building was "Nu trageți, nu trageți!" ("Do not shout, do not shout, it's me!" as shouted a famous gangster chraracter (Lascar, aka Lascarică) of the series signed by S. Nicolaescu. Nevertheless, for this important last communist drama role, after 1999 Caramitru was cast by Western film makers in different roles

=== Selected films ===
Year	Title	Role	Notes
1995	Citizen X	Tatevsky	TV movie
2004	Adam and Paul	Eastern European Man	
2013	Charlie Countryman	Victor Ibanescu	

== See also ==
- List of members of the National Salvation Front Council

== Bibliography ==
- (In Romanian) "Caramitru se cere afară din PPCD" ("Caramitru Demands to be Registered as out of the PPCD"), in Evenimentul Zilei, 24 February 2006
- András Bozóki, Intellectuals and Politics in Central Europe, Central European University Press, Budapest, 1999 ISBN 963-9116-21-1
- Răzvan Brăileanu,
  - (In Romanian) "Disidenţă, revoluţie, GDS" ("Dissidence, Revolution, GDS"), interview with Radu Filipescu, in 22, January 2004
  - (In Romanian) "Ţărănistul Ioan Talpeș" ("The PNȚ-ist Ioan Talpeş"), in 22, March 2006
- (In Romanian) Adrian Herța, "Comunitatea Aromână din România şi problema crizei de legitimitate" ("The Romanian Aromanian Community and Legitimacy Crisis Issue"), in Ziua Constanța, 23 September 2006
- Daniel Meyer-Dinkgräfe, Who's Who in Contemporary World Theatre, Routledge, London, 2000, p. 45 ISBN 0-415-14161-3
- (In Romanian) Cristian Preda, "«Mircea, fă-te că lucrezi!»" ("Mircea, Pretend You're Working!"), in Ziarul Financiar, 25 April 2005
- (In Romanian) Sorin Roșca Stănescu, Summary of Marea Provocare, Vol. I, Part I
- (In Romanian) Alex Mihai Stoenescu, "Decembrie '89 – Revoluția română, în direct" ("December '89 – the Romanian revolution, live in front of cameras"), in Jurnalul Național, 13 December 2005

Government offices
Preceded by Grigore Zanc	Minister of Culture of Romania; 12 December 1996 – 28 December 2000	Succeeded by Răzvan Theodorescu
