= Cosmești =

Cosmeşti may refer to several places in Romania:

- Cosmești, Galați, a commune in Galați County
- Cosmești, Teleorman, a commune in Teleorman County
