= Ionel Budișteanu =

Romanian violinist and conductor (1919-1991)

- Born: Voicu Nae Ion; 8 October 1919, Budești
- Died: 30 October 1991 (72 years old), Bucharest, Romania
- Genres: lăutărească music, popular, folklore adaptations, café-concert, romances, classical
- Occupations: Violinist, orchestrator, conductor, composer
- Instrument: violin

Ionel Budișteanu (8 October 1919, Budești, Ilfov County (today in Călărași County) – 30 October 1991, Bucharest) was a renowned Romanian violinist, conductor and musical arranger, of Roma ethnicity, often called "the lord of Romanian popular music".

== Biography ==
He was born on 8 October 1919, in a family of famous musicians from Budești commune, Ilfov county. From the name of the commune he got his name "Budișteanu". His father, Vasile Budișteanu, played the cimbalom in various Bucharest formations, being later co-opted into the orchestra of Grigoraș Dinicu, participating in the Universal Exhibitions in Paris (1937) and New York (1939).

He followed his musical studies at the Royal Academy of Music and Dramatic Art in Bucharest (1933–1936), having as teachers Vasile Filip (violin), Victor Gheorghiu and Ioan D. Chirescu (theory-solfeggio), Constantin Brăiloiu (folklore and history of music), Mihail Andricu (chamber music). Unable to attend classes regularly, he transferred to the "Pro Arte" Private Conservatory of Music in Bucharest (1936–1937), where he had Alexandru Theodorescu, concertmaster of the Philharmonic, as teacher. Although he performed at the Sala Dalles with the "Pro Arte" Orchestra in 1938, when he performed the Concerto in E major for violin and orchestra by J.S.Bach, Budișteanu went on to abandon classical music, turning to popular music.

In the period from 1940 to 1946 he was a violinist in the orchestra of Victor Predescu (who performed at Radio Romania) and that of Petrică Moțoi in Bucharest. He later became a violinist-soloist in the Orchestra of the "Banu Mărăcine" Ensemble from Bucharest between 1946 and 1947.

In 1947 he became violinist-soloist of the "Barbu Lăutaru" folk music orchestra in Bucharest, and from 1950 became its conductor, leading the orchestra in parallel with Nicu Stănescu for almost two decades, until 1970.

He followed two tours at the International Youth Festivals in Warsaw (1955) and Moscow (1957), where he had exceptional successes (which earned him the title of "Artist Emeritus"). Budișteanu took over the management of popular music bands (made up of the best elements from Bucharest) and began touring in Greece, United States (here he led the Ensemble called "Romanian Rhapsody" in 1962), France, Belgium, Netherlands, Germany, Austria, Israel (the band was called "Miorița"), Algeria and Morocco.

Between 1970 and 1991 he was the conductor of the "Romanian Rhapsody" Orchestra from Bucharest, supporting tours in Poland, France, USSR, Cyprus, Greece, Bulgaria, United States, Mexico, Japan, Israel, Egypt, Argentina, Brazil, England, China, Mongolia, Spain, Italy, Switzerland, Sweden, Finland, Norway, Austria, Germany, Belgium, Netherlands, Turkey, Ceylon, India, Burma, Yugoslavia, Hungary, Albania and Denmark.

Many important folk music singers and instrumentalists performed under his baton (for example, Maria Lătărețu, Ioana Radu, Angela Moldovan, Ion Luican, Emil Gavriș, Nicolae Crăciunescu, Ilie Udilă, Nicolae Florian, Nicolae Vișan, Ilie Alecu, Aurel Ioniță, Constantin Pârvu, Radu Simion, Damian Luca, Iliuța Rudăreanu, Traian Lăscuț Făgărășanu and Constantin Cocriș).

== Death ==
He died on 30 October 1991 in Bucharest. He was buried at the Bellu cemetery, very close to Amza Pellea and Ioana Radu.

== Distinctions ==
- "Laureate of the State Prize, first class" (for the years 1950–1951)
- Medal "Ordinul "Muncii"", 3rd class (1953)
- The title of "Artist emeritus of the P.R.R." (1957)
- The title of "People's Artist" (1962)
- "Cultural Merit" Order, 2nd class (1966)

== Bibliography ==
- Cosma, Viorel: Lăutarii de ieri și de azi, ediția a II-a, Editura „Du Style”, București, 1996, pp. 317–368, ISBN 973-9246-05-2
- Cosma, Viorel: Interpreți din România. Lexicon. Dirijori – cântăreți – instrumentiști – regizori. Vol. I (A-F), Editura Galaxia, București, 1996, p. 107 ISBN 973-97473-5-3 ISBN 973-97473-6-1
- Cosma, Viorel: București. Citadela seculară a lăutarilor români (1550-1950), Fundația culturală Gheorghe Marin Sepeteanu, București, 2009, pp. 348–359, ISBN 978-973-88609-7-1
