= Costică Canacheu =

Romanian politician and businessman (born 1958)

- Born: October 15, 1958 (age 67)
- Occupations: Politician and businessman

Costică Canacheu (born October 15, 1958) is a Romanian politician and businessman of Aromanian descent. A participant in the 1989 Revolution, he started his political career as a member of the National Salvation Front (FSN), representing its successor, the Democratic Party (PD) to the Chamber of Deputies. Additionally, Canacheu is an activist supporting the official recognition of the Aromanians as an ethnic minority, being a founding member of the Aromanian Community Association (Romanian: Asociația Comunității Aromânilor din România, ACAR) and the Aromanian Cultural Society (Societatea Culturală Aromână; Aromanian: Sutsata Culturala Armâneascâ).

== Biography ==
Born to an Aromanian Romanian family in Budești, Călărași County, Canacheu graduated from the Electro-Energetic High School in Bucharest, and worked as a technician between 1978 and 1989. Between 1993 and 2000, he was head of the Administrative Board for a Bucharest-based private enterprise, SC Neico Grup SA.

He was an active participant in the Bucharest protests that led to the fall of the Nicolae Ceaușescu Communist government (December 1989), and took part in the establishment of the FSN during February 1990, serving as a member of the FSN-based administration (CFSN, later CPUN) in Sector 1 of the capital, and later as a member of the FSN Directory Council. In the 1990 election, Canacheu won a seat in the Constituent Assembly for Bucharest. In this capacity, he notably initiated a legislative project regarding parliamentary control over intelligence agencies (namely, Serviciul Român de Informații, SRI) and their archives.

In the early 1990s, Canacheu was among a group of former revolutionaries who, citing concerns that granting revolutionary certificates and privileges had become an instrument of corruption, formed the non-governmental organization Asociația Revoluționarilor fără Privilegii (the Association of Non-Privileged Revolutionaries); other members include Ion Caramitru, Dan Pavel, Victor Rebengiuc, and Radu Filipescu.

Following the September 1991 Mineriad, he joined Petre Roman's FSN faction which became, in 1995, the Democratic Party, and was its Executive Director for Organizing during the 1992 legislative election. Canacheu was head of the Municipal Electoral Committee in Bucharest (1994-1996), and, in late 1996, headed the campaign in favor of Anton Vătășescu for the office of Mayor of Bucharest (Vătășescu had received support from Uniunea Social-Democrată, USD, an alliance between the PD and the Romanian Social Democratic Party). Between 1997 and 1999, he was a member of the PD's Directory Council, and, from 1999 to 2001, head of the PD's Sector 1 branch. A member of the PD's Municipal Organization, Canacheu became a member of the party's National Coordinating Council (2000–2002) and the Executive Secretary of its National Permanent Bureau (2002).

He became a PD deputy for Bucharest following the 2000 legislative election, and won the same seat as part of the Justice and Truth alliance during the 2004 election. Serving on the Committee for Defense, Public Order and National Security, of which he was president, Canacheu was also deputy member of the Romanian delegation to the Parliamentary Assembly of the Council of Europe. In late 2006, he proposed changes in Romanian legislation regarding access to classified information, arguing in favor of unrestricted parliamentary access to the latter (amended by the National Liberal senator Norica Nicolai, the project was eventually passed).

Costică Canacheu supports the view that the 26,500 Aromanians in Romania (of whom approx. 1,300 speak Aromanian as their mother tongue) should be recognized as a separate ethnicity, and has proposed changes in the Law on Minorities. He also called on the Romanian Television to initiate special broadcasts in Aromanian at a national level. In autumn 2006, several of the issues he raised were brought to the attention of the Ministry of Culture, and a review of his proposals was due by September 2006 (in December of the same year, Canacheu announced that no resolution had been passed).
