= Radu Simion =

Romanian pan flute musician and conductor

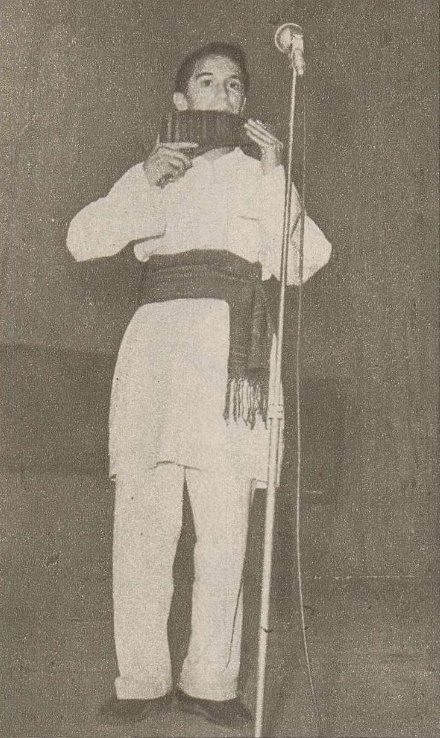
- Born: 27 February 1940, Ștefan cel Mare, Argeș
- Died: 16 February 2015, Bucharest
- Occupation: Musician

Radu Simion (27 February 1940 Ștefan cel Mare, Argeș – 16 February 2015, Bucharest) was a virtuoso pan flute player and a Romanian leader of the orchestra.

== Early life ==
Simion was born on 27 February 1940 in Ștefan cel Mare, Argeș.

== Study ==
Having a passion for music since it was little, he studied first the accordion by himself. When he was 11 gave an exam at "Music Middle School" and got a ten. He started studying the dulcimer with Gheorghe Pantazi. He travelled in China with a tournament and Radu Simion risked a second year. It was a must for him to move to the pan flute class, where he had Fănică Luca as a teacher and he was considered one of the best students of his. He was colleague with other famous pan flutes such as: Damian Luca, Gheorghe Zamfir and Constantin Dobre. After six months of studying with Fănică Luca, he goes to National Contest of Music Schools where he won the first place. The "Flacăra" Magazine dedicated then an article to him.

== Artistic activity ==
He was requested at Radio Romania to transmit six parts learned with his teacher. The conductor Victor Predescu didn't endorse the records because the parts were part of his repertoire Fănică Luca. This incident ambitioned him so much that he went to search the parts, which later would bring his appreciation. He went to a fiddler from Arges, uncle Diță (real name Militaru Andrei), which gives him some parts.

With the passing of time, he made the repertoire which included old songs such as "Say, say, old man" or "From city-hall above". After two years of study, he had again the chance to record with Victor Predescu which remains amazed by his interpretation.

By an internship he took at "Ciocârlia" restaurant, he is discovered by the big conductor Ionel Budișteanu which was there to eat one day. When he heard him sing he told him that he needed a pan flute in Perinița aggregate. He was employed with 527 lei/month. He was a colleague with Rodica Bujor, Ana Pop Corodan, Ion Lucian and later Ștefania Rareș. Another collaborator was Maria Tănase. She asked him to make a group of people who are going to accompany her and Fărămiță Lambru on the shows. He quickly finds the perfect people and the group is built by Nicolae Bob Stănescu on cembalo, Nicolae Turcitu on accordion and Dumitru Jean on contrabass and they started a series of shows at "Constantin Tănase" theatre. There were Gr. Vasiliu Birlic and N. Stroe. From Maria Tănases' idea, he became the head of the orchestra and started to sing at night bar "Athenee Palace".

In 1965 he recorded his first disc, a little vinyl with four songs. On that disc can be found popular and fiddler songs.

Besides the foreign shows and ones in the capital, Radu Simion was often called by communists to parties and receptions doing a lot of concerts with Nicu Stănescu.

"My story with communists began since Gheorghiu-Dej which called me to sing for him since I was a student. Then Ceaușescu called me to sing when he hunted. We went and stayed with then when hunting all day and in the evening when the fest began, we had to sing while they were eating. Many times we didn't know where he was getting us. He putted us on a van and we travelled to restaurant to the woods he was hunting. The he called be to be on all the receptions. After that I was invited to drink with them a sprit. The most beautiful memory was when the United president arrived in Romania. I sang to Richard Nixon and Ceaușescu held my microphone. It was the first man of the world. The first president of the US who walked in Romania was Richard Nixon..and Ceaușescu held my microphone because he was bothered by journalists. This means respect! "

Radu Simion had the occasion to sing in front of biggest heads such as Iosip broz tito, Richard Nixon, Rheza Pahlavi and so on. He sang in 34 countries on 4 continents: Europa, America, Asia, and Africa.
