= Ciuperceni =

Ciuperceni may refer to several places in Romania:

- Ciuperceni, Gorj
- Ciuperceni, Teleorman
- Ciuperceni, a village in Agriș Commune, Satu Mare County
- Ciuperceni, a village in Cosmești, Teleorman
