= Videle oil field =

Oil field in Romania

Videle
- Country: Romania
- Region: Teleorman County
- Offshore/onshore: onshore
- Operator: Petrom

Field history
- Discovery: 1958
- Start of development: 1958
- Start of production: 1961

Production
- Current production of oil: 22,000 barrels per day (~1.1×10^{6} t/a)
- Estimated oil in place: 41 million tonnes (~ 50×10^{6} m^{3} or 300 million bbl)

The Videle oil field is an oil field located in Videle, Teleorman County, Romania. It was discovered in 1958 and developed by Petrom. It began production in 1961 and produces oil. The total proven reserves of the Videle oil field are around 300 million barrels (41 million tonnes), and production is centered on 22,000 barrels per day (3,500 m^{3}/d).
