= Miculescu =

Miculescu is a Romanian surname. Notable people with the surname include:

- Constantin Miculescu, physicist
- Ninel Miculescu, Romanian weightlifter
- Valentin Miculescu, Romanian footballer
- Simona Miculescu, Romanian diplomat
