= Bechet =

- Town
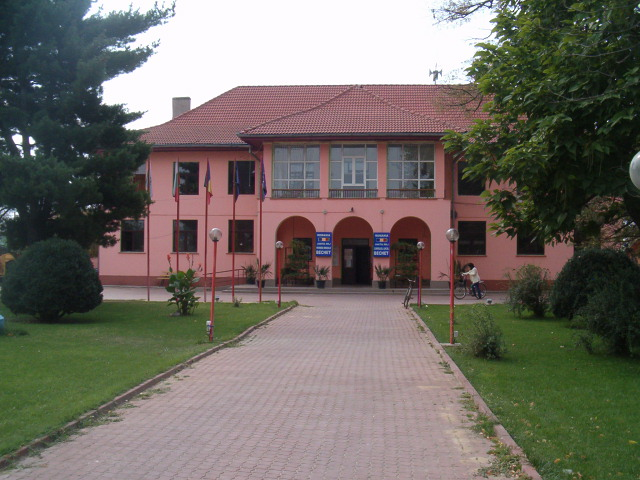
- Bechet town hall

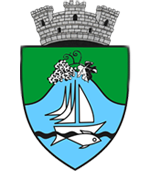
- Coat of arms

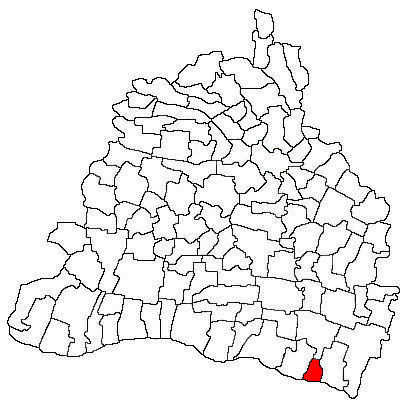
- Location in Dolj County

- Location in Romania
- Coordinates: 43°47′N 23°57′E
- Country: Romania
- County: Dolj

Government
  - Mayor (2024–2028): Adrian Glăvan (PSD)
- Area: 25.31 km^{2} (9.77 sq mi)
- Elevation: 40 m (130 ft)
- Population (2021-12-01): 4,355
  - Density: 172.1/km^{2} (445.6/sq mi)
- Time zone: UTC+02:00 (EET)
  - Summer (DST): UTC+03:00 (EEST)
- Postal code: 207060
- Area code: (+40) 02 51
- Vehicle reg.: DJ
- Website: primariabechet.ro

Bechet is a town in Dolj County, Oltenia, Romania, on the river Danube, opposite the Bulgarian city of Oryahovo.

== Demographics ==
Historical population
Year	Pop.	±%
2002	3,864	—
2011	3,363	−13.0%
2021	4,355	+29.5%
Source: Census data

At the 2021 census, the town had a population of 4,355, of which 77.98% were Romanians and 18.37% Roma.

== Points of interests ==
At Bechet Port, there is a 126.5 m (415 ft) tall unused electricity pylon, which is the tallest such structure in Romania. The pylon was built in 1967 as part of the Danube crossing of the 220 kV-line Ișalnița–Kozloduy; since the demolition of this line, this is the only relic of it.

== See also ==
- List of towns in Romania by Romani population
- Romani people in Romania
