= Iulică Cazan =

Romanian sports shooter

Personal information
- Nationality: Romanian
- Born: 23 August 1980 (age 44); Budești, Romania

Sport
- Sport: Sports shooting

Iulică Cazan (born 23 August 1980) is a Romanian sports shooter. He competed in the men's 25 metre rapid fire pistol event at the 2000 Summer Olympics.
