= Ulmeni, Maramureș =

Ulmeni Sülelmed
- Town
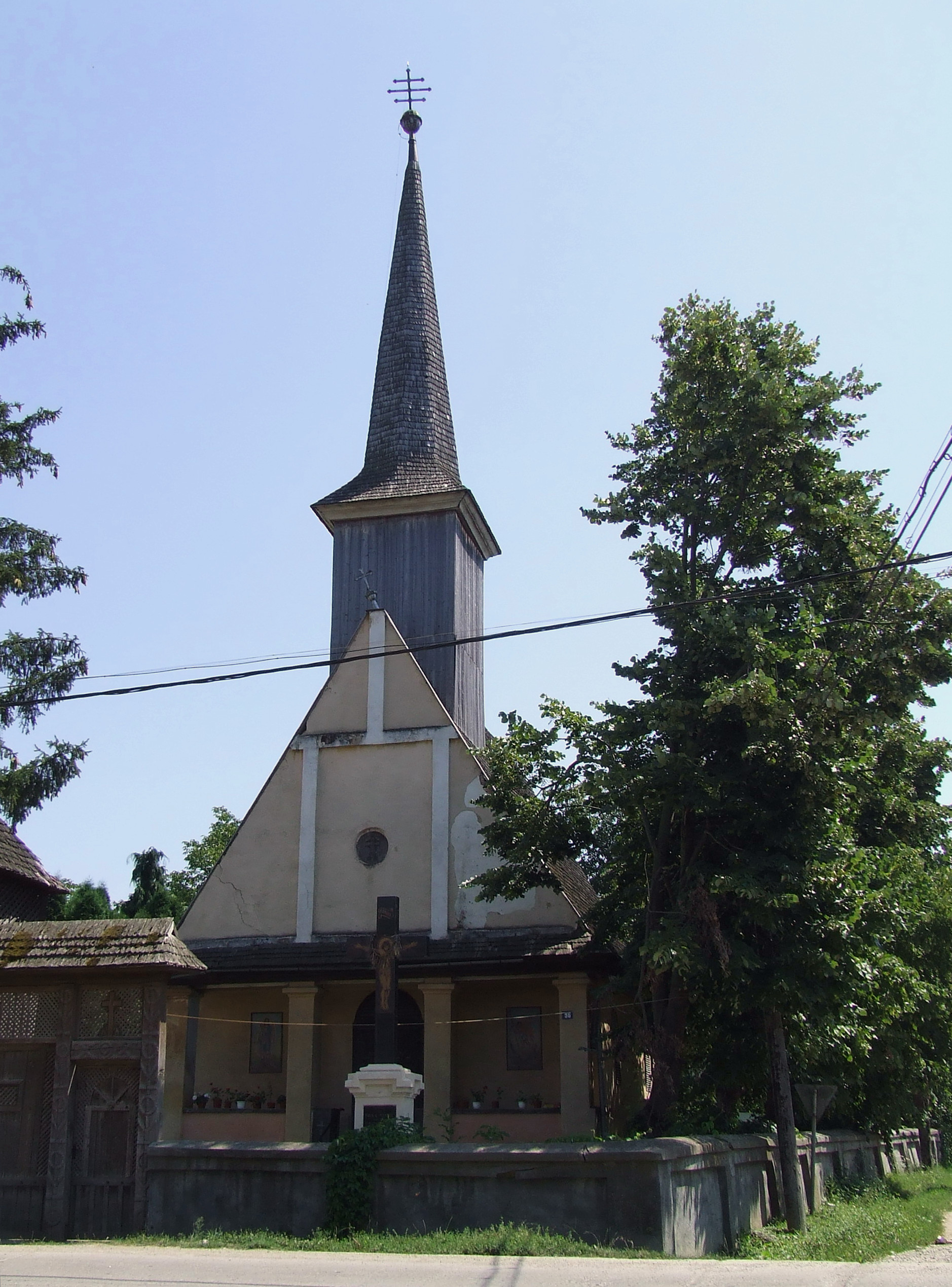
- Wooden church in Ulmeni

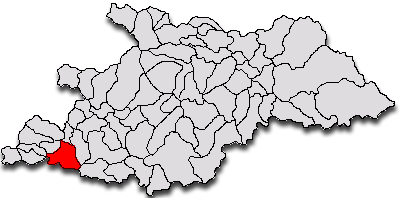
- Location in Maramureș County

- Location in Romania
- Coordinates: 47°27′56″N 23°18′1″E
- Country: Romania
- County: Maramureș

Government
  - Mayor (2024–2028): Lucian Morar (PSD)
- Area: 81.49 km^{2} (31.46 sq mi)
- Elevation: 173 m (568 ft)
- Population (2021-12-01): 7,110
  - Density: 87.2/km^{2} (226/sq mi)
- Time zone: UTC+02:00 (EET)
  - Summer (DST): UTC+03:00 (EEST)
- Postal code: 437355
- Area code: (+40) 02 62
- Vehicle reg.: MM
- Website: primariaulmenimm.ro

Ulmeni (formerly Șilimeghiu; Hungarian: Sülelmed; German: Ulmendorf) is a town in Maramureș County, Crișana, Romania. It was declared a town in 2004. The town administers seven villages: Arduzel (Szamosardó), Chelința (Kelence), Mânău (Monó), Someș-Uileac (Szilágyújlak), Tohat (Szamostóhát), Țicău (Szamoscikó), and Vicea (Vicsa).

== Geography ==
Ulmeni is located in northwestern Romania, in the southwestern extremity of Maramureș County, 35 km (22 mi) from the county seat, Baia Mare, on the border with Sălaj County. It lies on the left bank of the Someș River, being the first town that the river crosses in Maramureș County.

The town has two train stations (Ulmeni Sălaj and Țicău) serving the CFR Main Line 400, which connects Brașov with Baia Mare and Satu Mare.

== Demographics ==
Historical population
| Year | Pop. | ±% |
|---|---|---|
| 1880 | 3,830 | — |
| 1900 | 4,542 | +18.6% |
| 1910 | 5,204 | +14.6% |
| 1930 | 5,503 | +5.7% |
| 1956 | 6,639 | +20.6% |
| 1977 | 7,351 | +10.7% |
| 1992 | 7,444 | +1.3% |
| 2002 | 7,153 | −3.9% |
| 2011 | 7,078 | −1.0% |
| 2021 | 7,110 | +0.5% |
Source: Census data

At the 2021 census, Ulmeni had a population of 7,110, of which 49.06% were Romanians, 23.73% Roma, and 20.37% Hungarians. At the 2011 census, the town had 7,078 inhabitants, of which 53.6% were Romanians, 23.7% Hungarians, and 22.5% Roma. In 2002, 69.5% were Romanian Orthodox, 23.2% Reformed, 4% Pentecostal, 1% Greek-Catholic, 0.5% Roman Catholic, and 1.3% stated they belonged to another religion.

== Natives ==
- Ignațiu Darabant (1738–1805), Greek Catholic hierarch, bishop of the Romanian Catholic Eparchy of Oradea Mare
- Petre Dulfu (1856–1953), poet, translator, and playwright

== See also ==
- List of towns in Romania by Romani population
- Romani people in Romania
