= List of towns in Romania by Romani population =

This list contains Romanian urban localities (municipalities or cities/towns) in which Roma people make up over 5% of the total population, according to the 2011 census. The Roma are an ethnic group which make up 3.3% of Romania's population. There are several rural localities (communes and villages) which also have Roma populations exceeding 5% of the total population, even though those are not listed here.

In localities where Roma make up more than 20% of the population, the Romani language can be used when addressing local authorities, while state-funded education and bilingual signs are also provided. This arrangement applies in several communes, as well as in three towns: Bechet, Budești and Ulmeni.

City	% Roma
Budești, Călărași	37.8
Bechet, Dolj	33.8
Ulmeni, Maramureș	22.5
Bolintin-Vale, Giurgiu	19.8
Murgeni, Vaslui	19.4
Dumbrăveni, Sibiu	18.4
Țăndărei, Ialomița	16.5
Mizil, Prahova	16.2
Ardud, Satu Mare	16.1
Săcueni, Bihor	15.7
Babadag, Tulcea	15.5
Lehliu Gară, Călărași	15.4
Ungheni, Mureș	14.9
Miercurea Sibiului, Sibiu	14.7
Șomcuta Mare, Maramureș	14.3
Dolhasca, Suceava	12.8
Aleșd, Bihor	12.7
Copșa Mică, Sibiu	11.9
Segarcea, Dolj	11.8
Huedin, Cluj	11.5
Tășnad, Satu Mare	11.4
Târnăveni, Mureș	11.2
Strehaia, Mehedinți	11.1
Pâncota, Arad	10.9
Sărmașu, Mureș	10.2
Podu Iloaiei, Iași	9.8
Iernut, Mureș	9.8
Șimleul Silvaniei, Sălaj	9.8
Făurei, Brăila	9.7
Buhuși, Bacău	9.6
Curtici, Arad	9.4
Ștefănești, Botoșani	9.3
Brezoi, Vâlcea	9.3
Blaj, Alba	9.2
Băilești, Dolj	9.1
Târgu Frumos, Iași	9.1
Râmnicu Sărat, Buzău	9.1
Geoagiu, Hunedoara	8.8
Dărmănești, Bacău	8.3
Mărășești, Vrancea	7.9
Teiuș, Alba	7.8
Potcoava, Olt	7.5
Drăgănești-Olt, Olt	7.5
Târgu Cărbunești, Gorj	7.3
Piatra-Olt, Olt	7.2
Corabia, Olt	7.2
Aninoasa, Hunedoara	7.1
Rupea, Brașov	7.1
Ocna Mureș, Alba	7.0
Buftea, Ilfov	6.8
Sebiș, Arad	6.7
Băneasa, Constanța	6.6
Miercurea Nirajului, Mureș	6.6
Luduș, Mureș	6.5
Reghin, Mureș	6.3
Adjud, Vrancea	6.2
Drăgășani, Vâlcea	6.2
Fundulea, Călărași	6.1
Oltenița, Călărași	6.1
Hârlău, Iași	6.1
Turda, Cluj	6.0
Jimbolia, Timiș	6.0
Călimănești, Vâlcea	6.0
Ineu, Arad	6.0
Pantelimon, Ilfov	5.9
Ștefănești, Argeș	5.9
Zlatna, Alba	5.8
Jibou, Sălaj	5.7
Însurăței, Brăila	5.6
Orăștie, Hunedoara	5.6
Codlea, Brașov	5.6
Hârșova, Constanța	5.5
Câmpia Turzii, Cluj	5.5
Năsăud, Bistrița-Năsăud	5.5
Boldești-Scăeni, Prahova	5.3
Sighișoara, Mureș	5.3
Valea lui Mihai, Bihor	5.3
Aiud, Alba	5.2
Moinești, Bacău	5.2
Vicovu de Sus, Suceava	5.0

== See also ==
- Romani people in Romania
- List of Romani settlements

== Sources ==
- Romanian 2002 Census Results Database: "Structura Etno-demografică a României" (in Romanian). Centrul de Resurse pentru Diversitate Etnoculturală.
