= Fănică Luca =

Romani-Romanian musician (1894–1968)

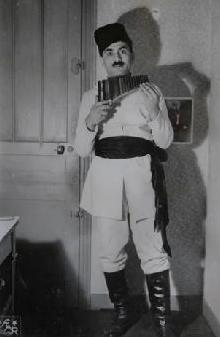

Background information
- Born: Fănică Luca; 5 April 1894; Ploieşti, Romania
- Died: 26 October 1968 (aged 74) Bucharest, Romania
- Genres: Lăutărească music
- Occupations: Lăutar, conductor
- Instrument: Pan flute
- Years active: 1916-1968
- Labels: Electrecord, Columbia

Fănică Luca (born Ştefan Luca Iordache; 5 April 1894 – 26 October 1968) was a Romani-Romanian musician and a Romanian pan pipe (nai) virtuoso, who was the first to make this instrument popular outside his own country.

== Background ==
He learned music from his father (who also played the nai, the Romanian pan pipe, in a band (taraf) of Lăutari) and brothers. Fănică Luca himself would also play in such orchestras, developing great skills and gaining a reputation as a pan pipe virtuoso.

In the 19th century the nai - originally an instrument of the lăutari with only 8 to 10 pipes, covering a little more than one octave - had been extended to about 20 pipes, giving far greater possibilities to a solo performer. Remarkable is the fact that Fănică Luca never learned reading musical scores, he always played by the ear.

== Performing career ==
In 1910, at age 16, he made his first international concert tour, during which he spent some months in İzmir, Turkey. Between 1920 and 1929 he regularly played in the best restaurants of Bucharest and his fame spread all over Romania. In 1929 he performed in Warsaw and Paris.

It was his concerts at the Universal Exhibition of Paris (1937) which gave the pan pipe its first popularity in the West. In 1937 Fănică Luca received the "Ordre des Palmes Académiques" from the French Ministry of National Education.

He also performed at the New York World's Fair in 1939. Thereafter he gave concerts in Russia, the People's Republic of China, Poland, Czechoslovakia, Hungary, Bulgaria and the USA.

== Teaching career ==
In 1949 Fanică Luca started teaching the nai. He was the teacher of a whole generation of famous Romanian pan pipe performers, such as Damian Luca, Damian Carlanaru, Constantin Dobre, Radu Constantin, Radu Simion (his son in law), Nicolae Pîrvu and Gheorghe Zamfir. Most of his best pupils scattered all over Europe and America, driven away by the dictatorial regime of Nicolae Ceauşescu.

== Awards and recognition ==
In 1951 he received the distinction of "Eminent Artist" from the People's Republic of Romania, the highest distinction a musician could get.
