= Constantin Miculescu =

Romanian physicist (1863–1937)

Constantin Miculescu (Romanian pronunciation: [konstanˈtin mikuˈlesku]; 6 September 1863 – 29 December 1937) was a Romanian physicist.

He was born in Crevenicu, Teleorman County, in a family of peasants, and completed his secondary studies at the Matei Basarab High School in Bucharest. He then studied in the Department of Physics and Mathematics of the University of Bucharest, where he took courses with teachers such as Spiru Haret, Marin Alexe, and Emanoil Bacaloglu. In 1886 he went to Paris to pursue his graduate studies at the Physics Laboratory of the Sorbonne, defending his doctoral thesis in 1891. The thesis, titled Sur la determination de l’équivalent mécanique de la calorie, was written under the direction of Gabriel Lippmann, the future Nobel laureate in Physics.

A professor at the University of Bucharest, his research focused on heat, optics, and acoustics. Miculescu is noted for his 1891 determination, with great precision, of the mechanical equivalent of the calorie using water circulated in a calorimeter.

He was married to Alexandrina Brătianu, the daughter of Teodor Brătianu (the brother of Ion C. Brătianu); the two had a daughter, Violeta. Miculescu died in Bucharest at age 74, and was buried, according to his wishes, at Cula Sultănica in Șuici, Argeș County.

An award of the Romanian Academy bears his name, and his bust by the sculptor Cornel Medrea is exhibited at the University of Bucharest.
