= Videle =

- Town
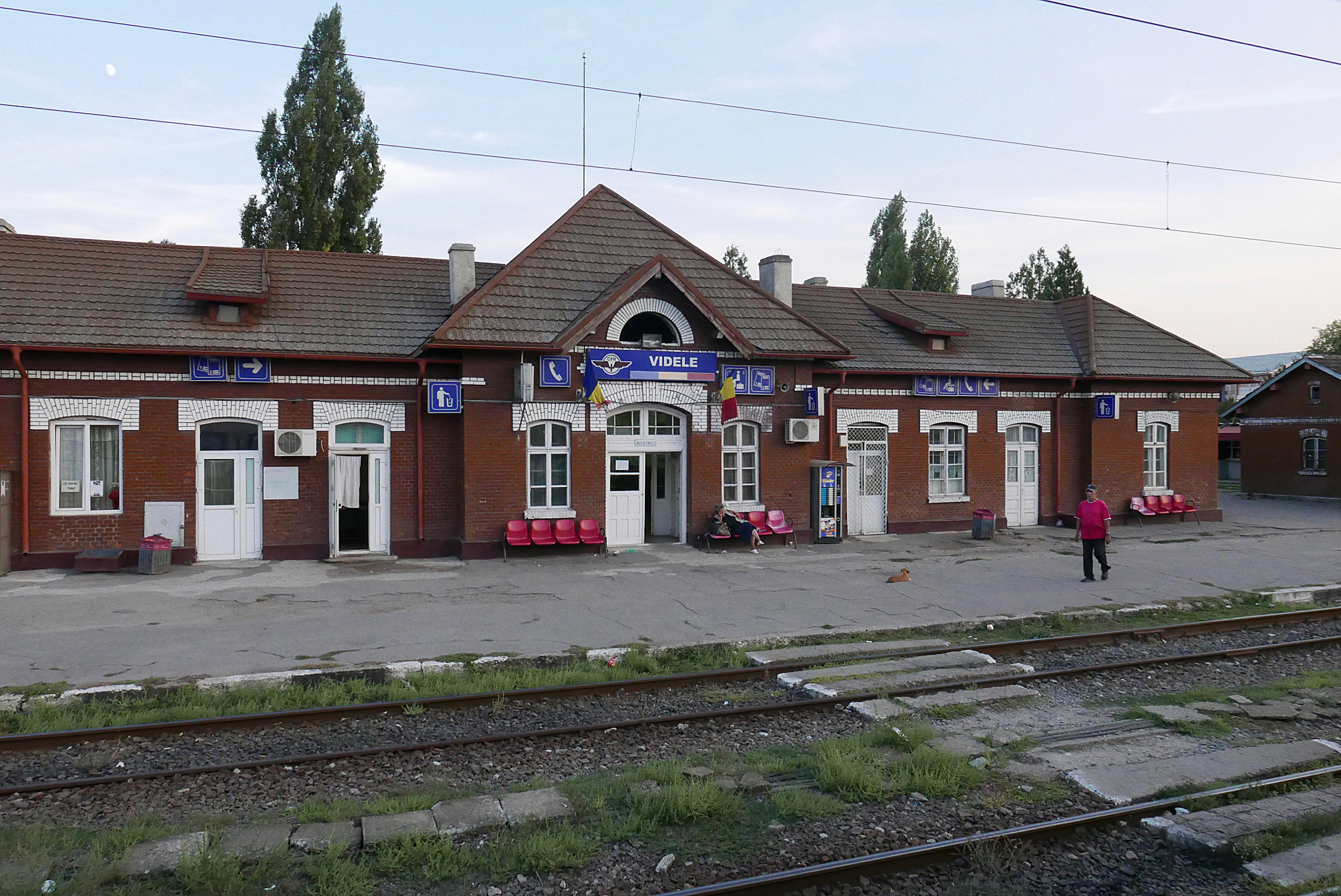
- Videle train station

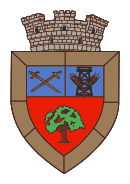
- Coat of arms

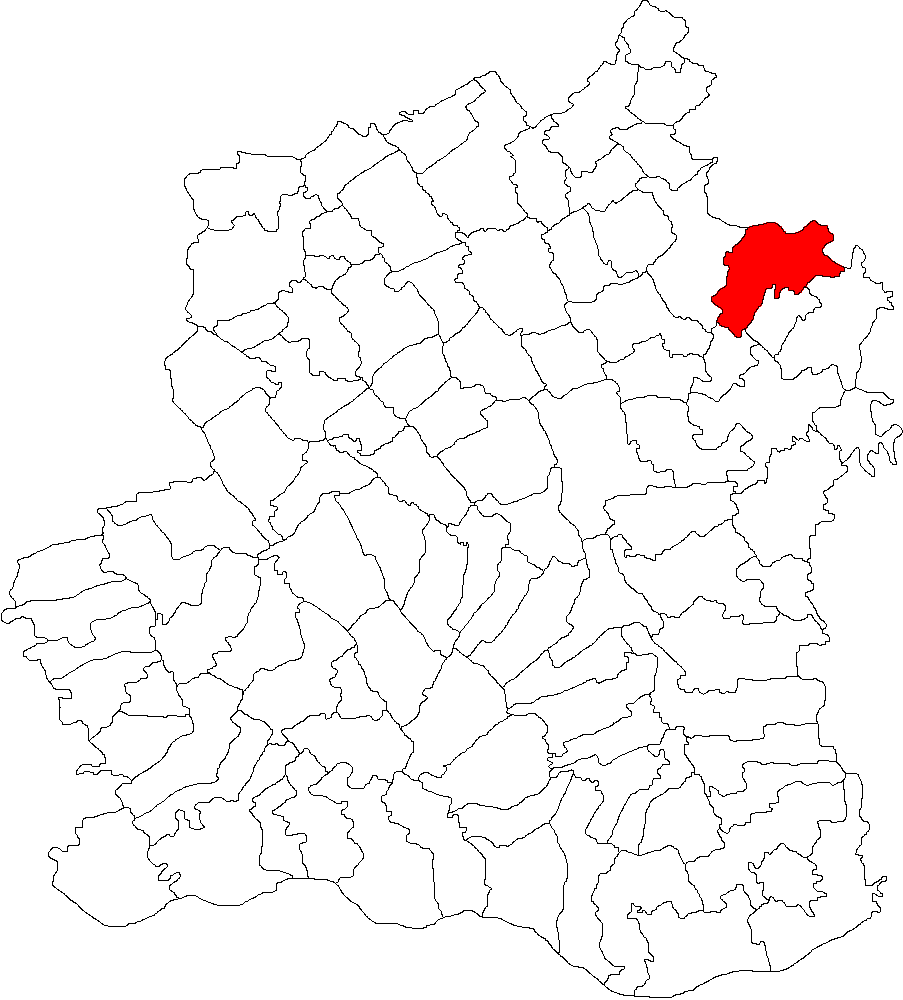
- Location in Teleorman County

- Location in Romania
- Coordinates: 44°17′N 25°32′E
- Country: Romania
- County: Teleorman

Government
  - Mayor (2024–2028): Cornel Gogan (PNL)
- Area: 79.96 km^{2} (30.87 sq mi)
- Elevation: 102 m (335 ft)
- Population (2021-12-01): 10,107
  - Density: 126.4/km^{2} (327.4/sq mi)
- Time zone: UTC+02:00 (EET)
  - Summer (DST): UTC+03:00 (EEST)
- Postal code: 145300
- Area code: (+40) 02 47
- Vehicle reg.: TR
- Website: www.primariavidele.ro

Videle (Romanian pronunciation: [ˈvidele]) is a town in Teleorman County, Muntenia, Romania, with a population of 10,107 in 2021. It was upgraded to town status in 1968 by incorporation of a few villages nearby. Today, Coșoaia is the single associated village the town administers.

Historical population
Year	Pop.	±%
1977	10,904	—
1992	13,024	+19.4%
2002	11,987	−8.0%
2011	11,508	−4.0%
2021	10,107	−12.2%
Source: Census data

== Geography ==
The town is situated on the Wallachian Plain, on the banks of the river Glavacioc and its left tributary, the Milcovăț. It lies in the northeastern part of Teleorman County, on the border with Giurgiu County.

== Transportation ==
Videle is located 49 km (30 mi) northeast of the county seat, Alexandria and 66 km (41 mi) west of Bucharest. It is crossed by county roads DJ503 and DJ601.

The town is of some importance as a railway junction, for the railway track heading south to Giurgiu and Bulgaria leaves the main Wallachian East-West-railway from Bucharest to Craiova.

== Economy ==
The Videle oil field is located on the administrative territory of the town.

== Demographics ==
At the 2021 census, the town had a population of 10,107; of those, 85.76% were Romanians and 3.81% Roma.

== Natives ==
- Valentin Costache (b. 1998), footballer
- Răzvan Ducan (b. 2001), footballer
