= Crevenicu =

- Commune
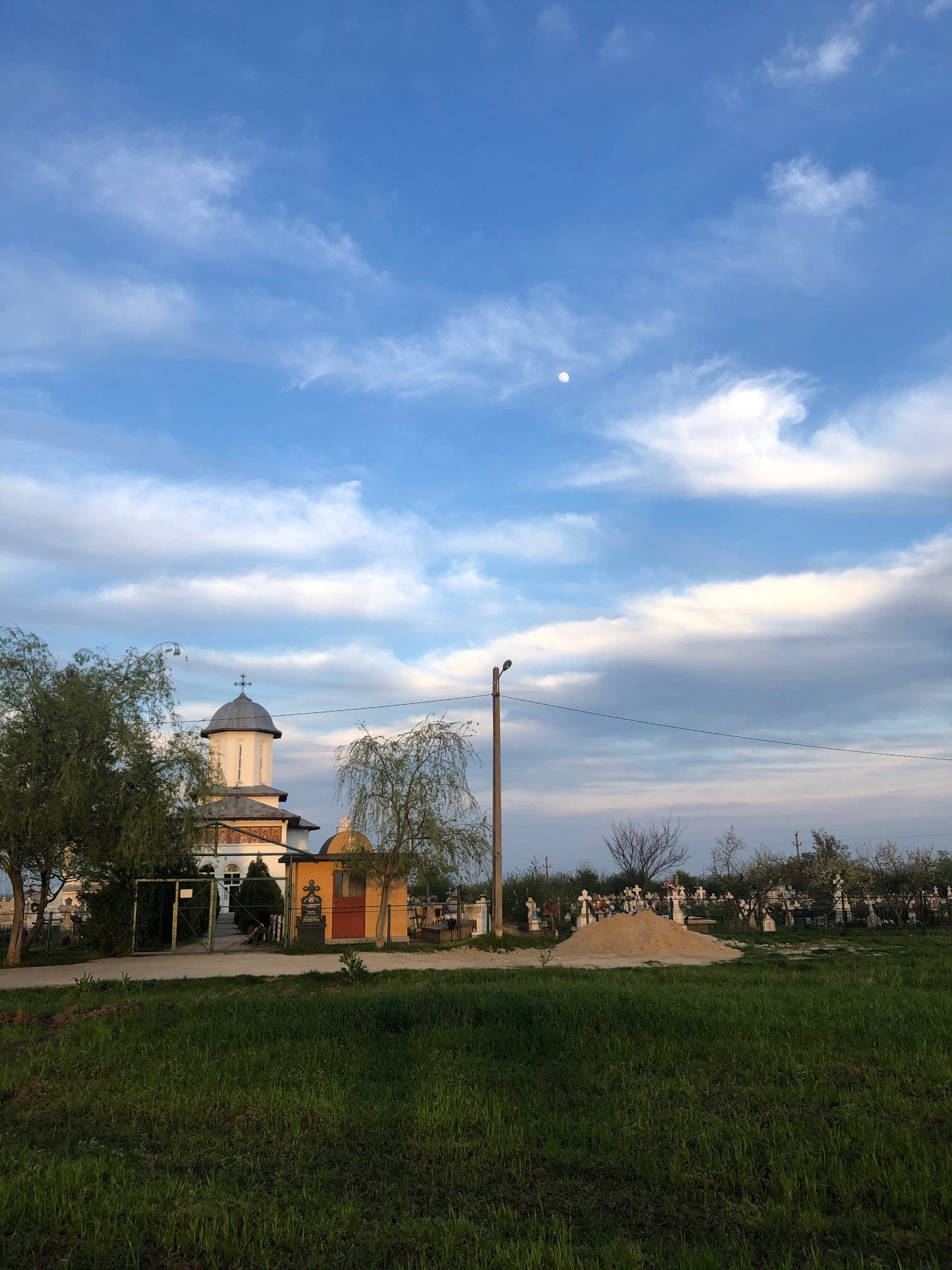
- Saint Nicholas Church in Crevenicu village

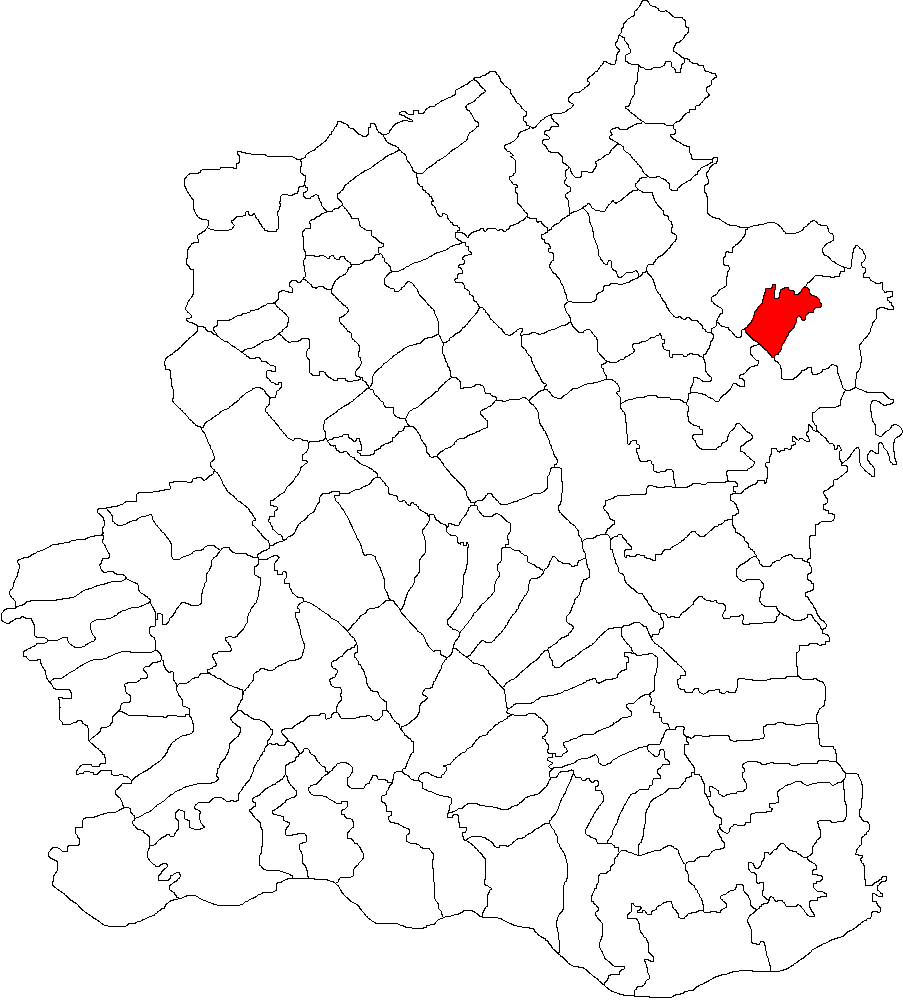
- Location in Teleorman County

- Location in Romania
- Coordinates: 44°14′N 25°35′E
- Country: Romania
- County: Teleorman
- Subdivisions: Crevenicu, Rădulești

Government
  - Mayor (2024–2028): Adrian Constantin Iancu (PNL)
- Elevation: 84 m (276 ft)
- Population (2021-12-01): 1,300
- Time zone: UTC+02:00 (EET)
  - Summer (DST): UTC+03:00 (EEST)
- Postal code: 147105
- Area code: +(40) 247
- Vehicle reg.: TR
- Website: primariacrevenicu.ro

Crevenicu (Romanian pronunciation: [kreveˈniku]) is a commune in Teleorman County, Muntenia, Romania. It is composed of two villages, Crevenicu and Rădulești.

At the 2021 census, the commune had a population of 1,300; of those, 93.69% were Romanians.

Historical population
Year	Pop.	±%
2002	1,744	—
2011	1,564	−10.3%
2021	1,300	−16.9%
Source: Census data

== Natives ==
- Constantin Miculescu (1863 – 1937), physicist
- Lucian Militaru (born 1962), politician
- Adriean Videanu (born 1962), businessman and former mayor of Bucharest
