= Budești =

Budești Budeshti
- Town
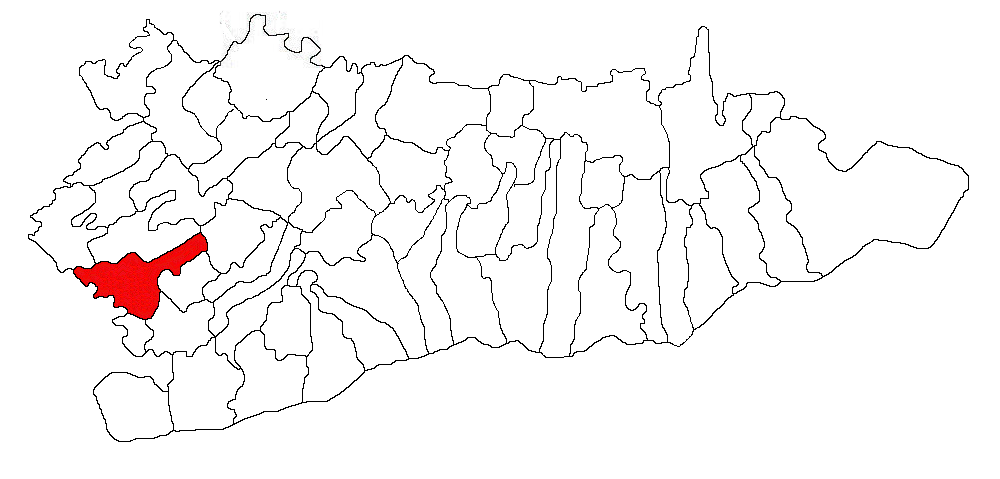
- Location in Călărași County

- Location in Romania
- Coordinates: 44°13′48″N 26°27′0″E
- Country: Romania
- County: Călărași

Government
  - Mayor (2024–2028): Mihai Ilie (PNL)
- Area: 93 km^{2} (36 sq mi)
- Elevation: 40 m (130 ft)
- Population (2021-12-01): 7,126
  - Density: 77/km^{2} (200/sq mi)
- Time zone: UTC+02:00 (EET)
  - Summer (DST): UTC+03:00 (EEST)
- Postal code: 915100
- Area code: (+40) 02 42
- Vehicle reg.: CL
- Website: www.primariebudesti.ro

Budești is a small provincial town in Călărași County, Muntenia, Romania. Three villages are administered by the town: Aprozi, Buciumeni, and Gruiu. It officially became a town in 1989, as a result of the Romanian rural systematization program.

== Geography ==
The town lies in the southwestern corner of the Bărăgan Plain, where the river Dâmbovița flows into the Argeș.

Budești is located in the western part of Călărași County, on the border with Giurgiu County. It lies at a distance of 30 km (19 mi) south-east of Bucharest, the capital of the country, and 77 km (48 mi) west of Călărași, the county seat.

== Demographics ==
Historical population
Year	Pop.	±%
1992	10,044	—
2002	9,596	−4.5%
2011	7,024	−26.8%
2021	7,126	+1.5%
Source: Census data

According to the 2021 census, Budești has a population of 7,126 people. It is the Romanian town with the largest proportion of Romani. As one of two urban areas where Romani make up more than 20% of the total population, Budești is also the one of two towns in Romania where the Romani language has co-official status alongside Romanian, with education, signage, and public service provided in both languages. 62% of the town's population is of Romanian ethnicity and 37.8% is of Romani ethnicity.

In terms of religion, 99.59% of the population declared themselves to be Romanian Orthodox at the 2002 census, 0.28% were Pentecostal, and 0.11% declared another religion.

== Natives ==
- Costică Canacheu (born 1958), politician and businessman
- Iulică Cazan (born 1980), sports shooter
- Marian Sârbu (born 1958), trade unionist and politician
- Constantin Ștefănescu Amza (1875–1964), general and politician

== See also ==
- List of towns in Romania by Romani population
- Romani people in Romania
