= Mereni, Teleorman =

Mereni
- Commune
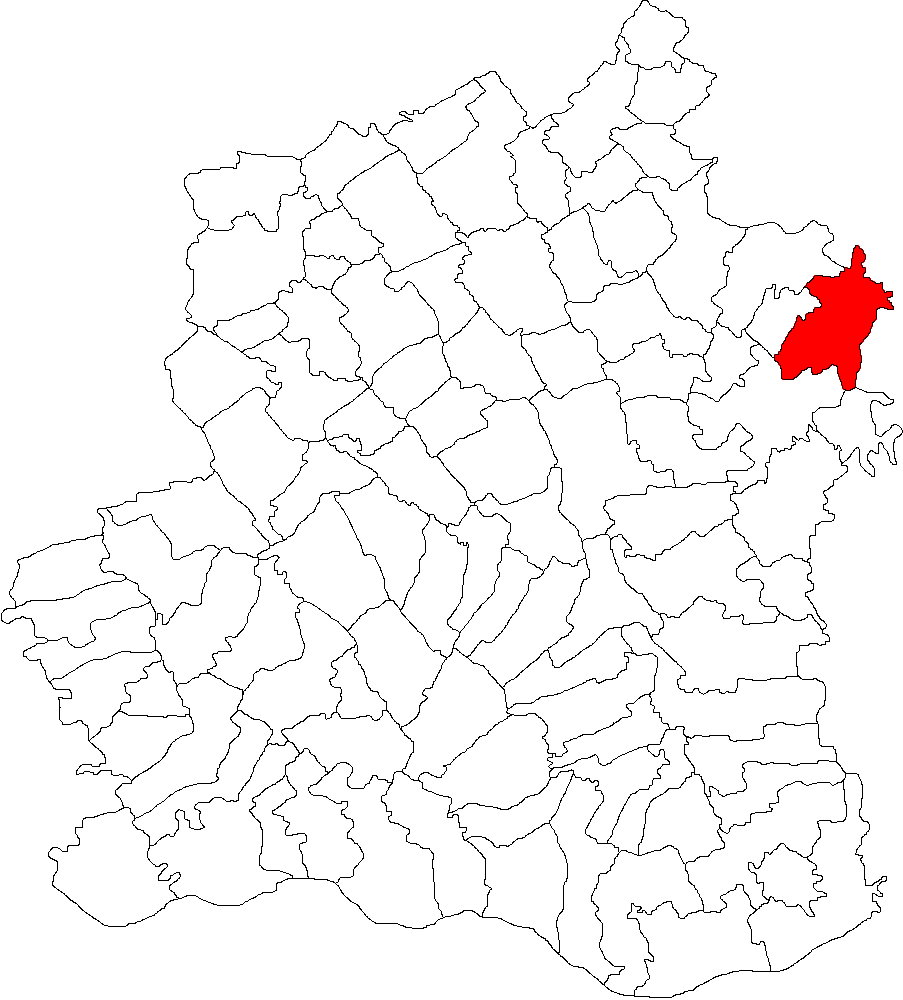
- Location in Teleorman County

- Location in Romania
- Coordinates: 44°14′N 25°38′E
- Country: Romania
- County: Teleorman
- Subdivisions: Merenii de Jos, Merenii de Sus, Ștefeni
- Population (2021-12-01): 2,630
- Time zone: EET/EEST (UTC+2/+3)
- Vehicle reg.: TR

Mereni is a commune in Teleorman County, Muntenia, Romania. It is composed of three villages: Merenii de Jos (the commune center), Merenii de Sus and Ștefeni.
