= Blejești =

- Commune
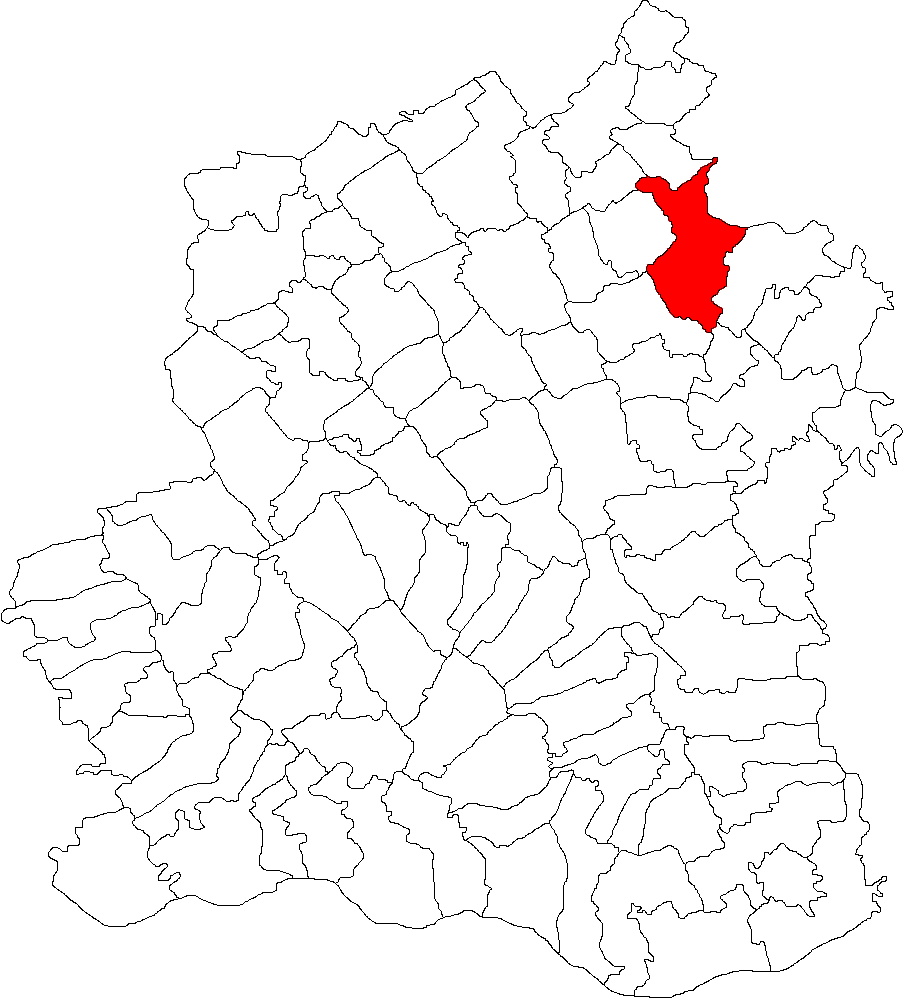
- Location in Teleorman County

- Location in Romania
- Coordinates: 44°18′N 25°28′E
- Country: Romania
- County: Teleorman
- Subdivisions: Baciu, Blejești, Sericu
- Population (2021-12-01): 3,655
- Time zone: EET/EEST (UTC+2/+3)
- Vehicle reg.: TR

Blejești (Romanian pronunciation: [bleˈʒeʃtʲ]) is a commune in Teleorman County, Muntenia, Romania. It is composed of three villages: Baciu, Blejești and Sericu.
