= Ghimpați =

- Commune
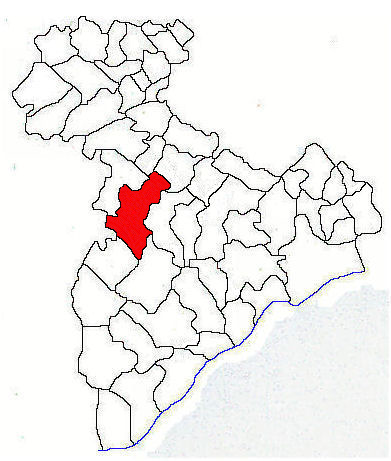
- Location in Giurgiu County

- Location in Romania
- Coordinates: 44°12′N 25°47′E
- Country: Romania
- County: Giurgiu

Government
  - Mayor (2020–2024): Constantin Cărăpănceanu (PNL)
- Area: 122.94 km^{2} (47.47 sq mi)
- Elevation: 76 m (249 ft)
- Population (2021-12-01): 5,690
  - Density: 46/km^{2} (120/sq mi)
- Time zone: EET/EEST (UTC+2/+3)
- Postal code: 87095
- Area code: +(40) 246
- Vehicle reg.: GR
- Website: primaria-ghimpati.ro

Ghimpați is a commune located in Giurgiu County, Muntenia, Romania. It is composed of four villages: Copaciu, Ghimpați, Naipu, and Valea Plopilor.

The commune is situated in the Wallachian Plain, on the banks of the river Câlniștea and its left tributary, the Glavacioc. It is located in the central-west part of Giurgiu County, 40 km (25 mi) north of the county seat, Giurgiu, on the border with Teleorman County.

The national road DN6 connects Ghimpați to Bucharest, 39 km (24 mi) to the northeast. Two other roads bifurcate from DN6 in the locality: DN5B, which goes to Giurgiu, and DN61, which goes north to Găești.

Historical population
Year	Pop.	±%
2002	6,132	—
2011	6,064	−1.1%
2021	5,690	−6.2%
Source: Census data

== Natives ==
- Liviu Ciobotariu (born 1971), football manager and former player
- Gheorghe Cristescu (1882 – 1973), socialist and then communist militant, first general secretary of the Romanian Communist Party
