= Purani =

- Commune
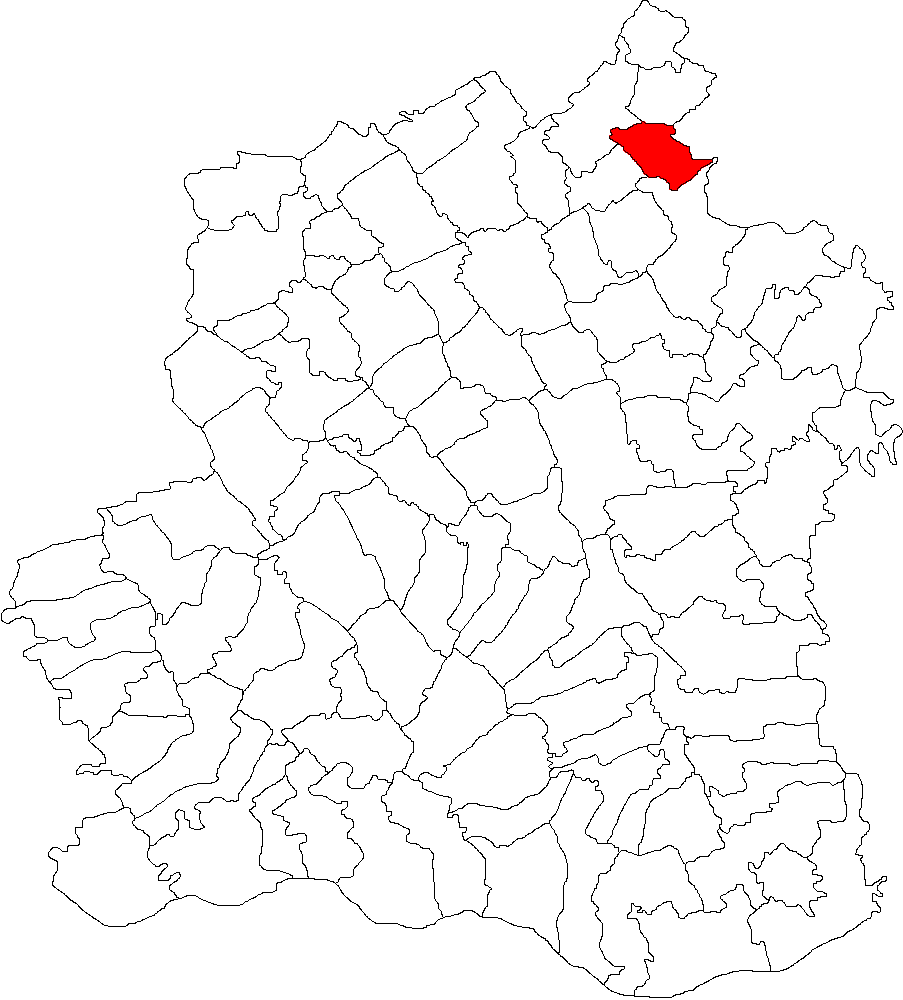
- Location in Teleorman County

- Location in Romania
- Coordinates: 44°22′N 25°24′E
- Country: Romania
- County: Teleorman
- Subdivisions: Purani, Puranii de Sus
- Population (2021-12-01): 1,372
- Time zone: EET/EEST (UTC+2/+3)
- Vehicle reg.: TR

Purani is a commune in Teleorman County, Muntenia, Romania. It is composed of two villages, Purani and Puranii de Sus, which were part of Siliștea Commune until 2004 when they were split off.
