= Radu Filipescu =

Romanian dissident

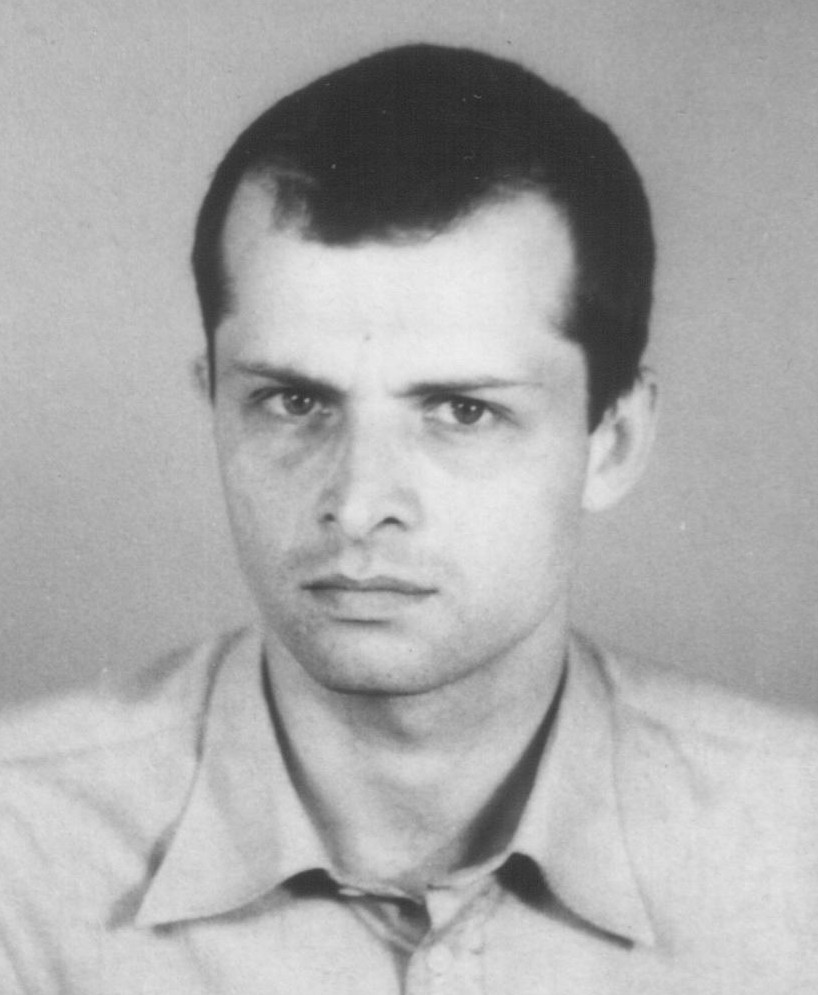
Radu Filipescu in May 1986

Radu Filipescu (born December 26, 1955) is a former Romanian anti-Communist dissident. During Nicolae Ceaușescu's regime, Filipescu was imprisoned for several years for "propaganda against the socialist order".

== Early life ==
Filipescu was born on December 26, 1955, in Târgu Mureș, the youngest son of Zorel Filipescu and Carmelita-Ileana Filipescu. Radu Filipescu's maternal uncle, Victor Groza, was the brother of Petru Groza, the first Communist Prime Minister of Romania.

From 1974 to 1979, he studied electronics at Politehnica University of Bucharest. He worked at the former Automatica factory in Bucharest until his arrest in 1983.

== Dissident activity before 1989 ==
Filipescu believed Romanians were dissatisfied with Ceaușescu's leadership and he attempted to organize protests in response. Between December 1982 and May 1983, he printed leaflets and put them in Bucharest mailboxes, calling for a protest at the Palace Square in Bucharest. On May 7, 1983, he was arrested and sentenced to 10 years in prison.

He served almost three years at the Rahova, Jilava, and Aiud prisons. In December 1984, he was named Amnesty International's Prisoner of the Month. With his family acknowledging his case abroad, international pressure from several non-governmental organizations (including the French Human Rights League, International Society for Human Rights, and the Swiss organization Le Pavé), and the efforts of politicians from Western Europe and the United States, Filipescu was released from prison on April 18, 1986.

In 1987, after attempting to organize a referendum against Ceaușescu's leadership, he was arrested on December 12 and was interrogated and beaten by Securitate officers. After a quick response from human rights organizations and radio broadcasters, including Radio Free Europe, the BBC, RFI, Deutsche Welle, and Voice of America, he was released on December 22, 1987, without an indictment. He was arrested a third time on December 22, 1989, but was released that same day at noon.

In May 1988, Filipescu and other political dissidents tried to start a free trade union, called "Libertatea" (Freedom). However, Securitate threats against those who tried to join squelched popular support.

== Civic activity after 1989 ==
After the Romanian Revolution of 1989, Radu Filipescu founded the Group for Social Dialogue and was elected president in 1998. He is a founding member of APADOR-CH, and founder and president of the Association of Revolutionaries without Privileges.

== Later life ==
Radu Filipescu patented the "Parrot Clip" (European patent 0563234, United States patent 5,457,392), an intended replacement to the alligator clip. It was awarded the gold medal at the 1991 Eureka World Fair of Inventions in Brussels.

He founded the company "Parrot Invent SRL" in 1992.

== Personal life ==
In 1988, Radu married Daniela Filipescu, a Romanian anesthesiologist at the C.C. Iliescu Institute for Cardiovascular Diseases in Bucharest. She is a member of the Board of Directors of the European Society of Anesthesiology and is the Deputy General Secretary of the Romanian Society of Anesthesia and Intensive Care. They have one son, Radu-Zorel Filipescu, who was born on February 2, 1998.
