= Siliștea, Teleorman =

Siliștea
- Commune
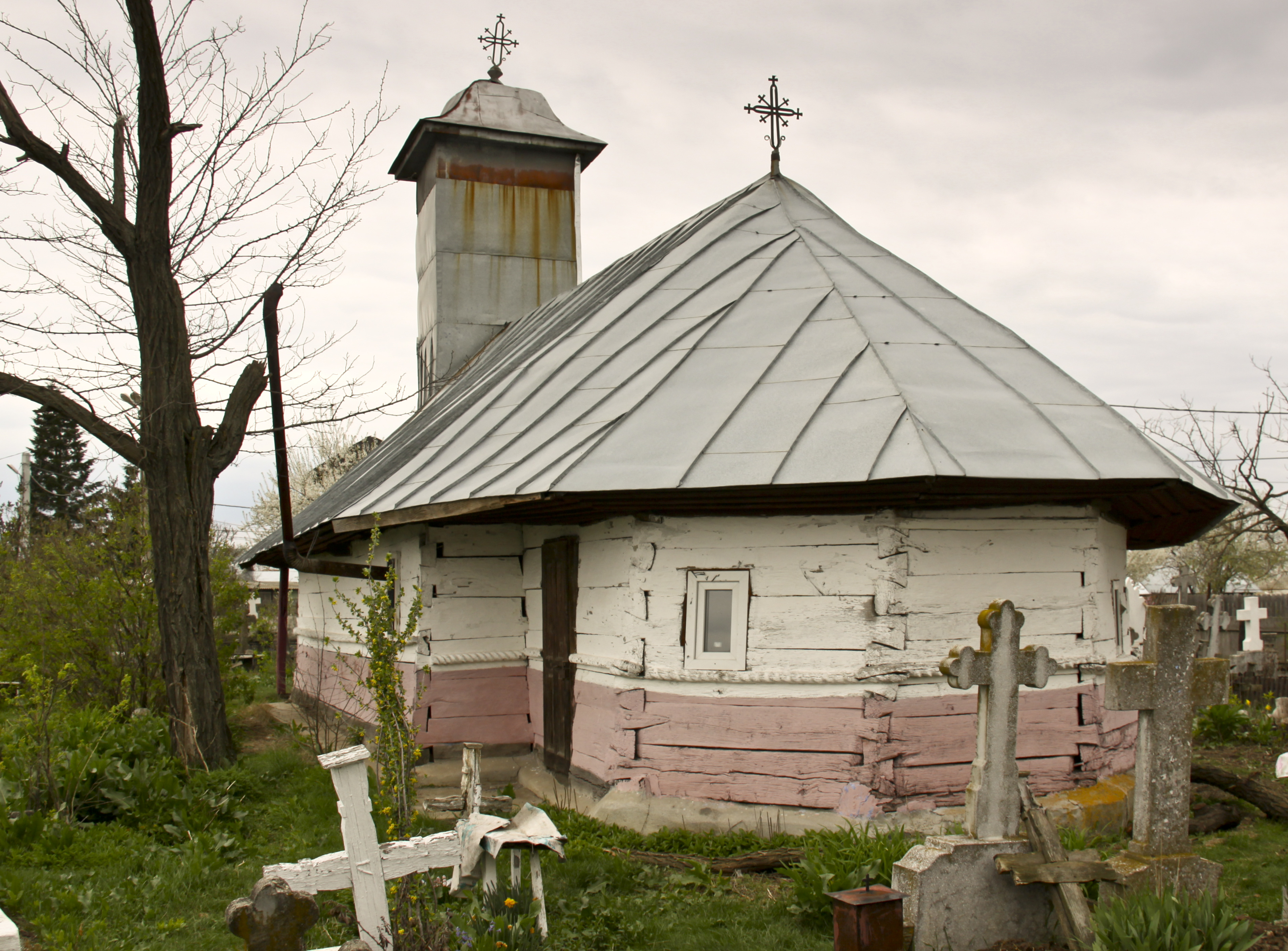
- Wooden church in Siliștea

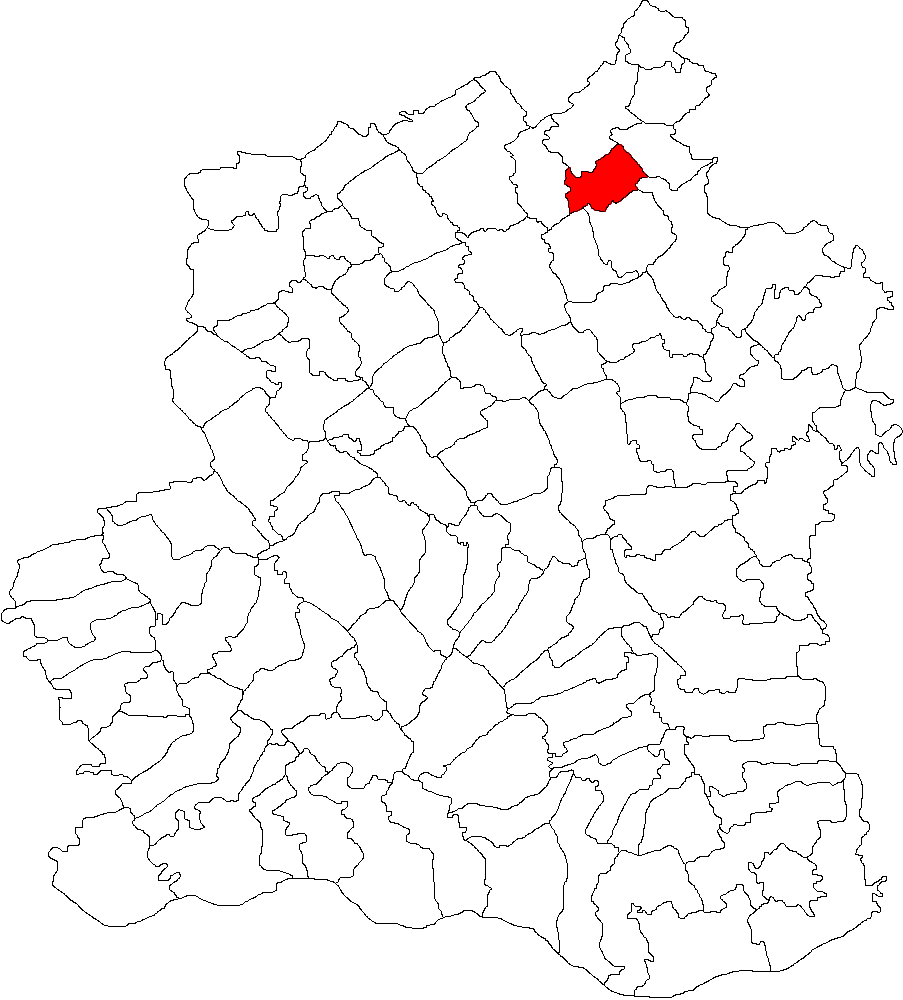
- Location in Teleorman County

- Location in Romania
- Coordinates: 44°22′N 25°21′E
- Country: Romania
- County: Teleorman
- Subdivisions: Butești, Siliștea, Siliștea Mică
- Population (2021-12-01): 2,049
- Time zone: UTC+02:00 (EET)
  - Summer (DST): UTC+03:00 (EEST)
- Vehicle reg.: TR

Siliștea is a commune in Teleorman County, Muntenia, Romania. It is composed of three villages: Butești, Siliștea and Siliștea Mică. It also included Purani and Puranii de Sus villages until 2004, when they were split off to form Purani commune.
