= Cosmești, Teleorman =

Cosmești
- Commune
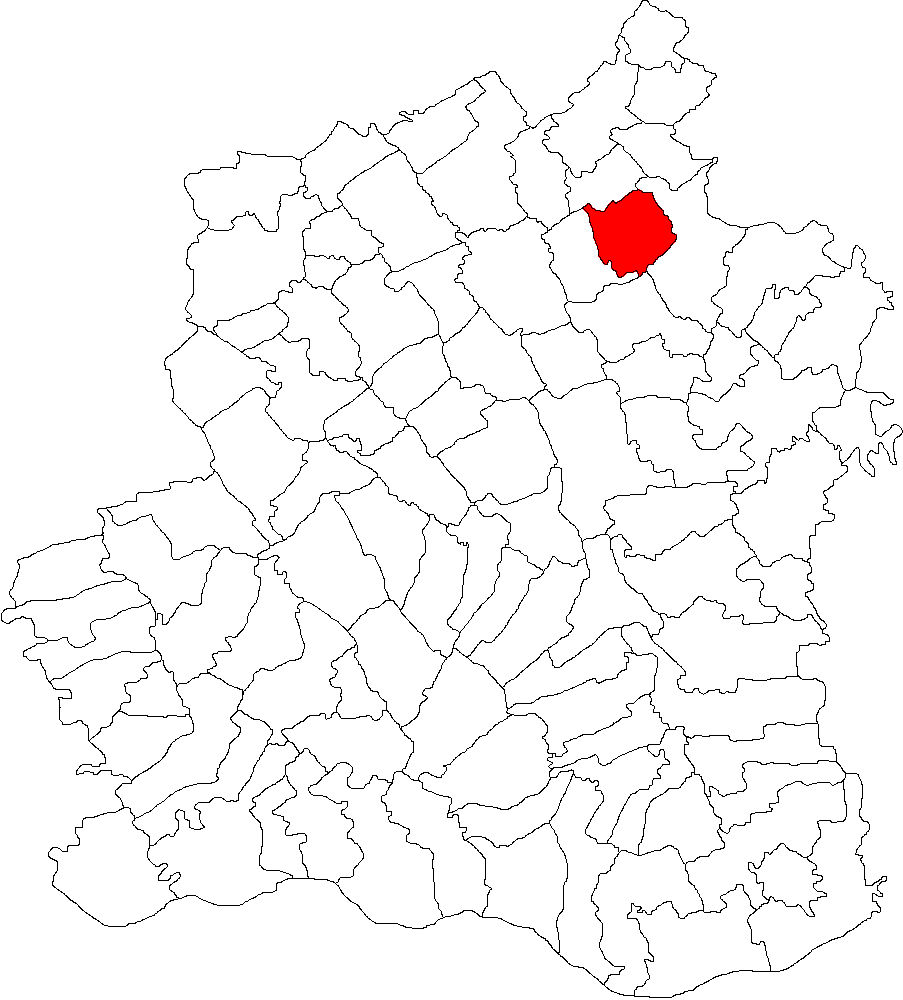
- Location in Teleorman County

- Location in Romania
- Coordinates: 44°18′N 25°23′E
- Country: Romania
- County: Teleorman
- Subdivisions: Ciuperceni, Cosmești
- Population (2021-12-01): 2,357
- Time zone: EET/EEST (UTC+2/+3)
- Vehicle reg.: TR

Cosmești (Romanian pronunciation: [kosˈmeʃtʲ]) is a commune in Teleorman County, Muntenia, Romania. It is composed of two villages, Ciuperceni and Cosmești.
