= Ștefan cel Mare, Argeș =

Ștefan cel Mare
- Commune
- Location in Romania
- Coordinates: 44°29′N 25°15′E
- Country: Romania
- County: Argeș
- Population (2021-12-01): 2,103
- Time zone: UTC+02:00 (EET)
  - Summer (DST): UTC+03:00 (EEST)
- Vehicle reg.: AG

Ștefan cel Mare is a commune in Argeș County, Muntenia, Romania. It is composed of two villages, Glavacioc and Ștefan cel Mare.
