= Letca Nouă =

- Commune
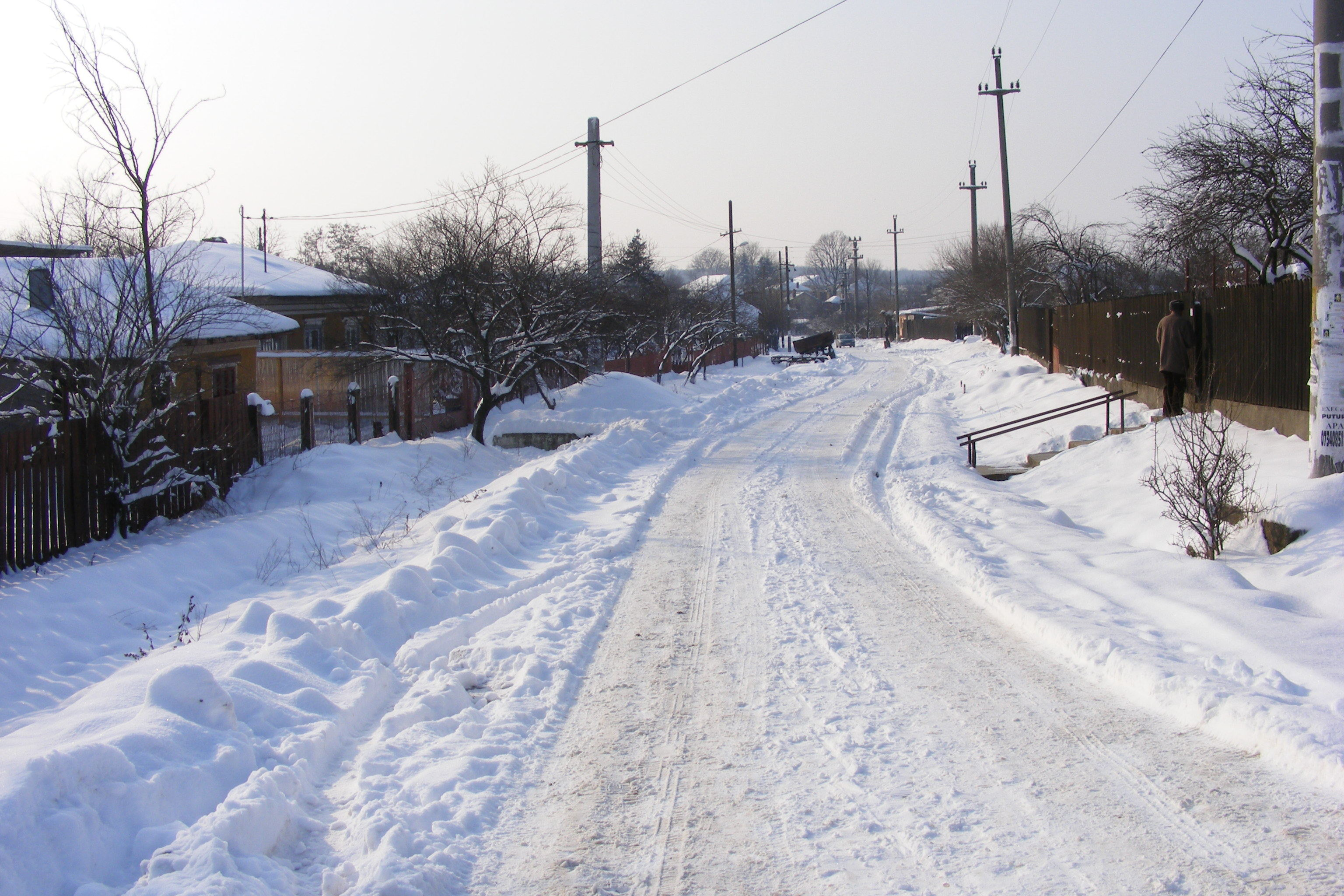

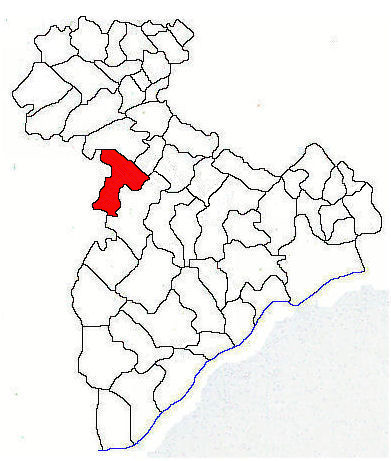
- Location in Giurgiu County

- Location in Romania
- Coordinates: 44°14′N 25°44′E
- Country: Romania
- County: Giurgiu

Government
  - Mayor (2024–2028): Marian Negru (PNL)
- Area: 77.64 km^{2} (29.98 sq mi)
- Elevation: 76 m (249 ft)
- Population (2021-12-01): 3,625
  - Density: 46.69/km^{2} (120.9/sq mi)
- Time zone: UTC+02:00 (EET)
  - Summer (DST): UTC+03:00 (EEST)
- Postal code: 87155
- Area code: +(40) 246
- Vehicle reg.: GR
- Website: www.comunaletcanoua.ro

Letca Nouă is a commune located in Giurgiu County, Muntenia, Romania. It is composed of three villages: Letca Nouă, Letca Veche, and Milcovățu.

Historical population
Year	Pop.	±%
2002	3,895	—
2011	3,817	−2.0%
2021	3,625	−5.0%
Source: Census data
